= Assumption of the Virgin (Titian) =

Painting by Titian

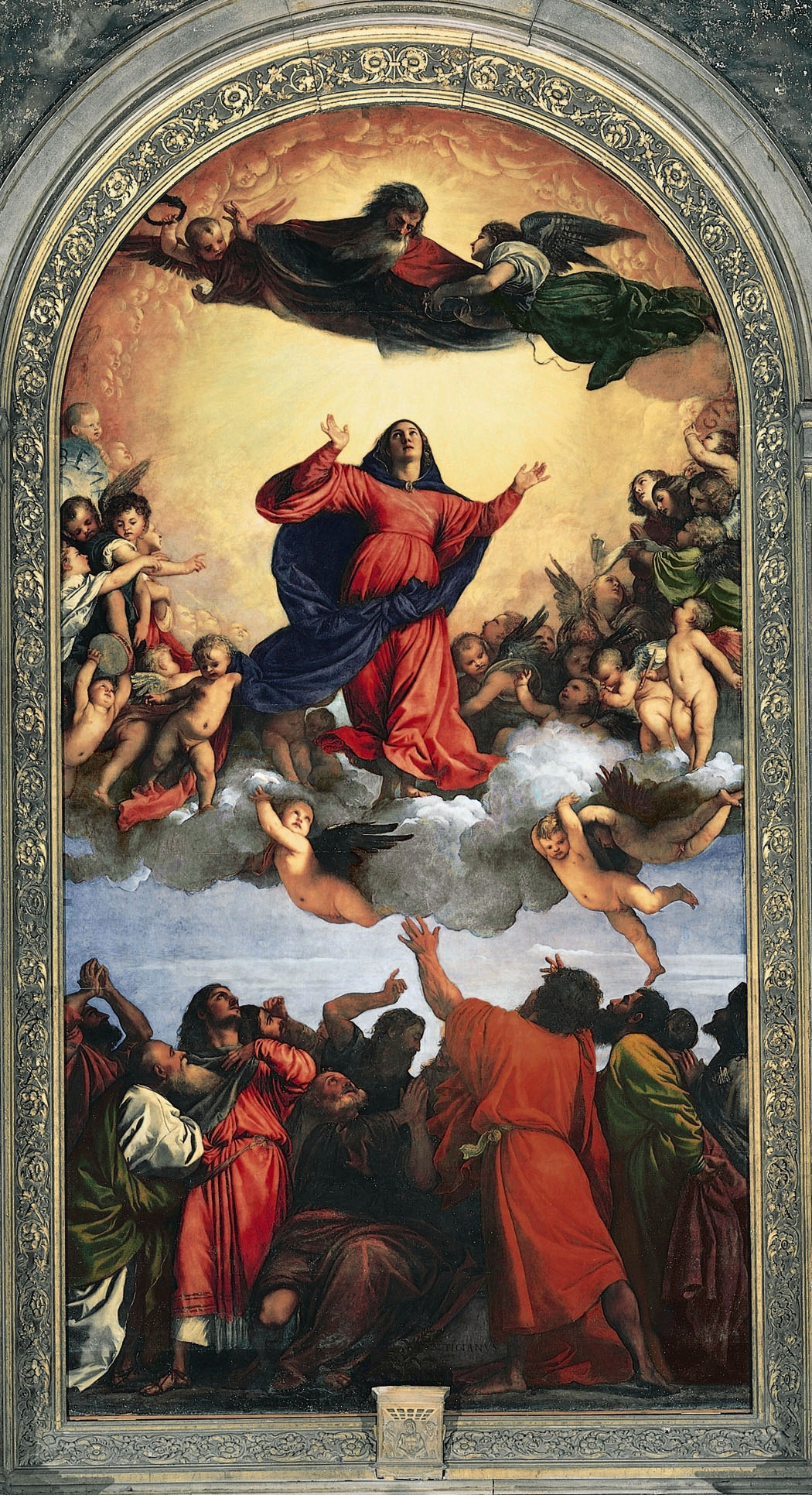
- Artist: Titian
- Year: 1516-1518
- Medium: Oil on panel
- Dimensions: 690 cm × 360 cm (270 in × 140 in)
- Location: Basilica di Santa Maria Gloriosa dei Frari, Venice

The Assumption of the Virgin or Frari Assumption, popularly known as the Assunta, is a large altarpiece panel painting in oils by the Italian Renaissance artist Titian, painted in 1515–1518. It remains in the position it was designed for, on the high altar of the Basilica di Santa Maria Gloriosa dei Frari or Frari church in Venice. It is the largest altarpiece in the city, with the figures well over life-size, necessitated by the large church, with a considerable distance between the altar and the congregation. The images above and below are not Titian's work, they are by Palma Vecchio.

It marked a new direction in Titian's style, reflecting his awareness of the developments in High Renaissance painting further south, in Florence and Rome, by artists including Raphael and Michelangelo. The agitated figures of the Apostles marked a break with the usual meditative stillness of saints in Venetian painting, in the tradition of Giovanni Bellini and others.

It was perhaps originally rather shocking for the Venetian public, but soon recognised as a masterpiece that confirmed Titian's position as the leading artist in Venice, and one of the most important in all Italy, a rival to Michelangelo and Raphael.

== Subject ==
The Assumption of Mary was a Catholic doctrine that remained optional in the early 16th century; it was not declared an article of faith until 1950. The Franciscan order whose church the Frari is, were always keen promoters of this and other aspects of Marian theology, in particular the related doctrine of the Immaculate Conception of Mary, then still a matter of live controversy. The doctrine held that the body of the Virgin Mary was "assumed" or moved physically into heaven "at the end of her earthly life". Most Catholics believed that this took place after a normal death (usually three days after in tradition), but some that Mary was still alive when it happened, a question that Munificentissimus Deus in 1950 was careful not to settle. At the base of the picture, glimpses of Mary's stone sarcophagus can be discreetly seen, allowing those believing in an assumption before death to ignore it or regard it as something else.

The broad composition of Titian's painting, with a group of apostles below a rising Mary, shown as alive, who moves towards a group of angels in heaven, follows earlier depictions in art, though such an imagined scene did not form part of the doctrine. The related scene of the Coronation of the Virgin in heaven had tended to be replaced by scenes showing the moment of the actual assumption, as here, which was often combined with it. Here the angel accompanying God the Father on the right holds out a crown, which he is about to place on her head.

== Description ==
The figures are in three zones, divided by spaces filled only with light. On the ground are the Apostles, tightly packed in a group and in a variety of dramatic poses, most looking up at the unprecedented sight of the Virgin Mary rising to heaven. They are shown in a variety of poses, ranging from gazing in awe, to kneeling and reaching for the skies, "monumental figures ... massed in collective movement, united with shadow, heroic gestures are given a silhouette of unprecedented boldness".

In the centre zone, the Virgin Mary stands on clouds, wrapped in a red robe and blue mantle, and also makes a gesture of astonishment. Around her "throngs of angels are melted into clouds irradiated by heavenly light". Above is God the Father, who is about to be handed a crown for Mary by the angel to the right (see above).

Titian broke with tradition by omitting all landscape elements, although the blue-grey sky above the apostles shows the scene is set outdoors. The sky contrasts with the golden heavenly light in the upper zones, which recalls the gold ground traditional in mosaics such as those still being made in San Marco, and the gold ground paintings of the Gothic period.

Altogether there are twelve apostles, some only visible by a small area of their face. Saint Peter sits at the centre with his hands together in prayer, and Saint John the Evangelist is the younger man in red to the left of him; the others are probably not intended to be identifiable. The painting is signed "TITIANUS" on the sarcophagus below St Peter.

== Location ==
The Frari is a very large Gothic church of the early 15th-century, initially plainly built of brick, like many Franciscan churches designed for preaching to large crowds, but now filled with elaborate tombs and paintings. Titian himself is buried there, though this is an unintended result of the chaos of the plague that killed him, with a large 19th-century monument that includes a relief version of the Assumption.

External videos
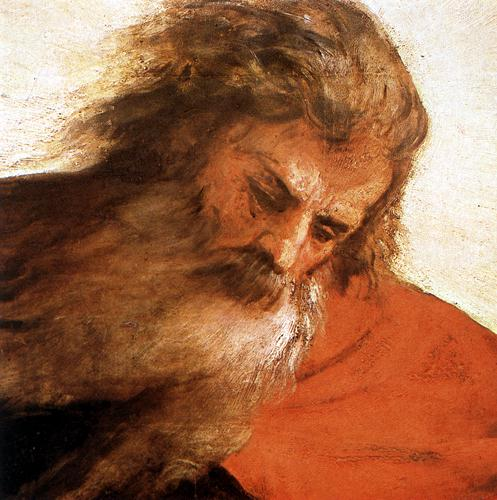
- Titian's Assumption of the Virgin, c. 1516-1518, Smarthistory

The high altar is a very long way from the nave, and the view of it is restricted by an elaborate stone choir-screen of 1475, with a round-headed arch in the centre, and a pulpit at each end. Immediately behind this, across about half the width of the church, is the choir, with rows of choir-stalls facing each other, and a high wooden backing. After this comes a wide but shallow area, reaching into the transepts, before the chancel in the apse, which is very deep. The rounded top of the painting allows it to be framed neatly by the choir-screen arch for a viewer standing at the central axis of the church even at the back of the nave, though from there it appears tiny. It also allows the rounded circle of heavenly light to complete the top of the composition, with no awkward corners to fill.

The high altar and its elaborate reredos framing the altarpiece was probably designed in its broad conception by Titian, to match his painting. The detailed design and execution was probably by Lorenzo Bregno. The painting is framed by an extension of the altar in marble and gilding, which matches not only the round top of the choir-screen arch, but (in broad terms) the scrolling decoration around it. The classical style, with large columns on either side, inevitably clashes somewhat with the Gothic style of the architecture, but efforts have been made to minimize this by aligning the levels of elements of both frame and painting with the zones of the architecture. For example, the top of the cornice of the frame is (depending on the viewing position) broadly the same as the level of the bottom of the third tier of windows.

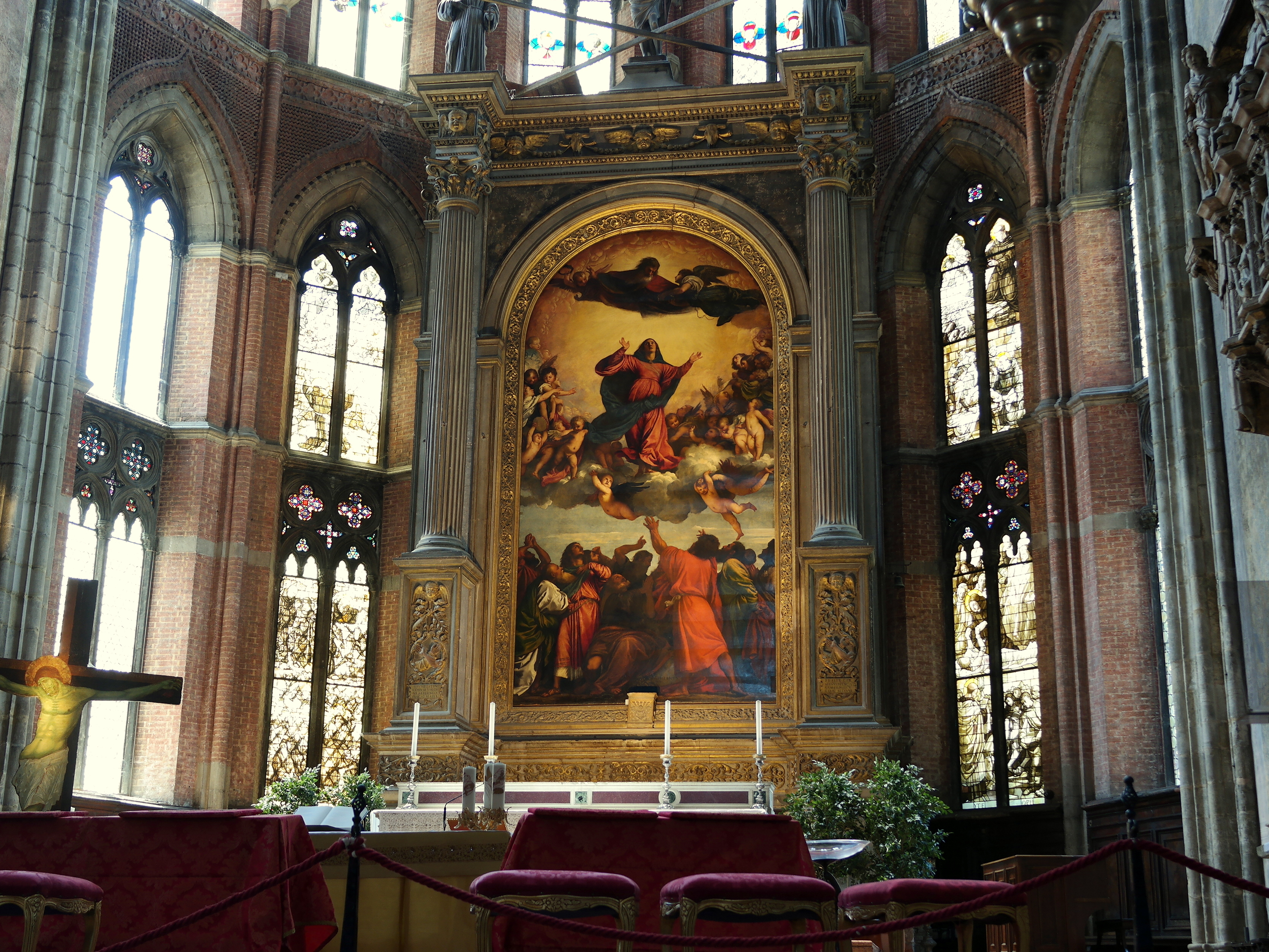
The full framing reredos

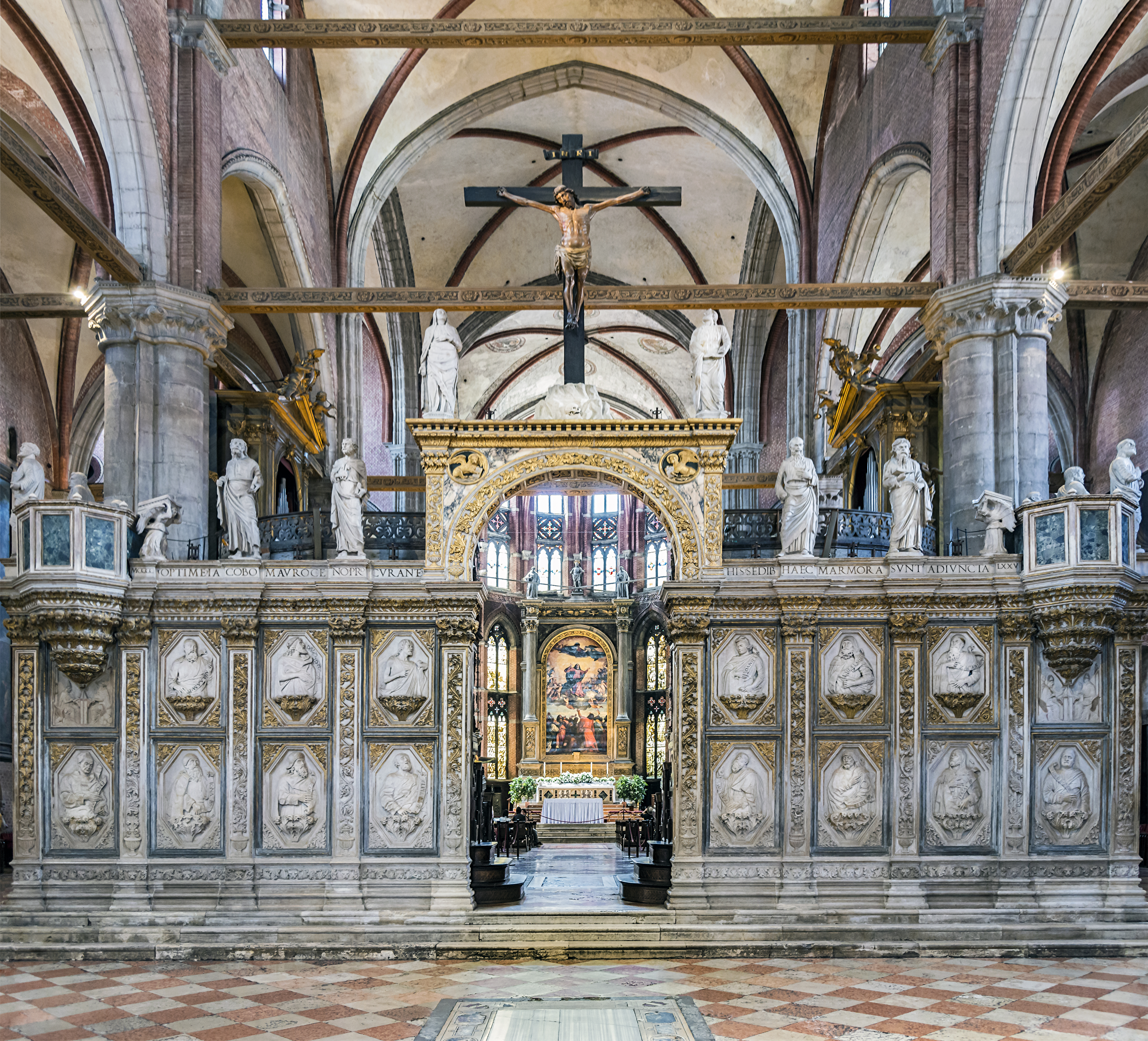
The painting seen through the arch in the choir-screen

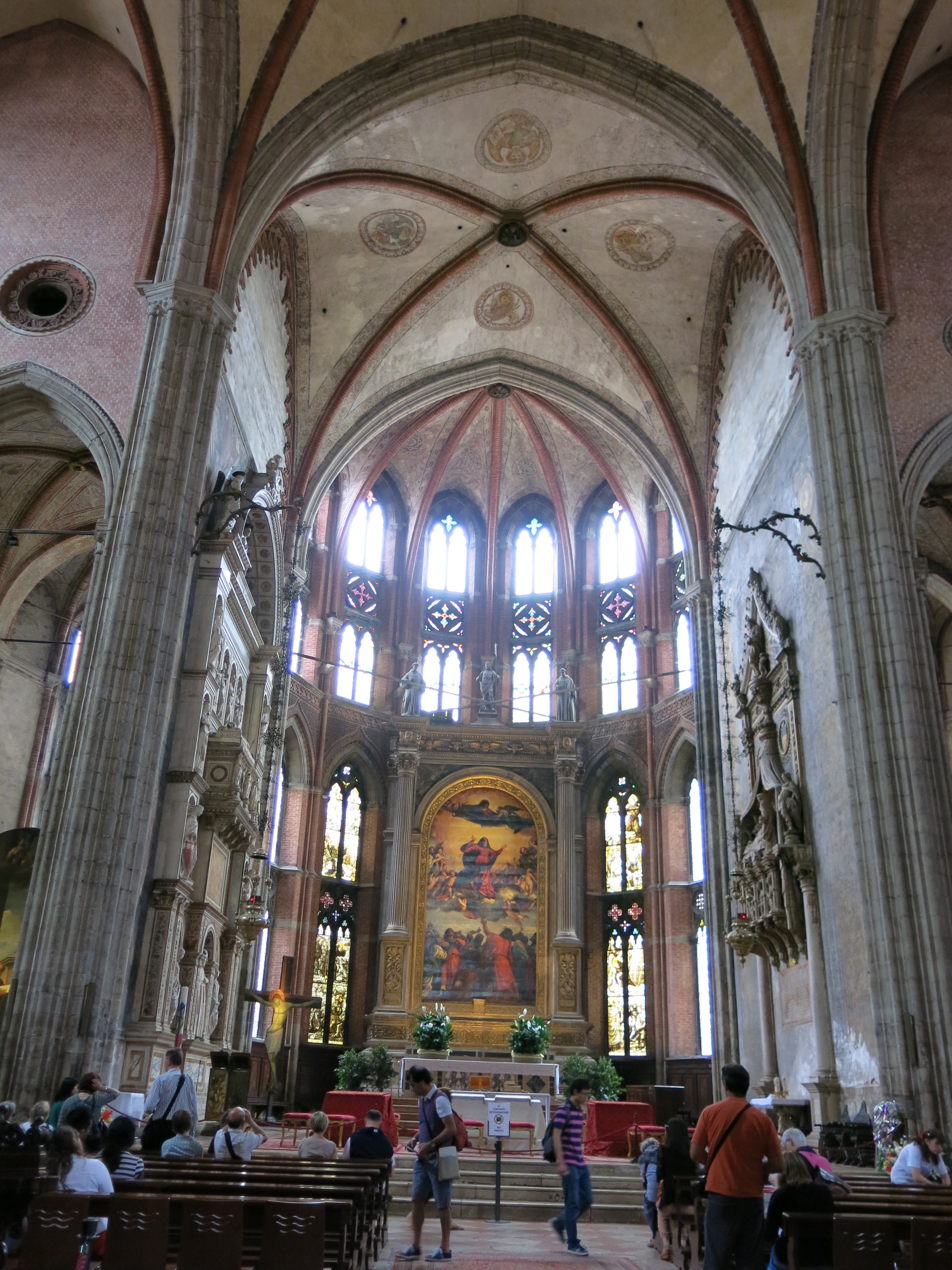
The apse from beyond the screen

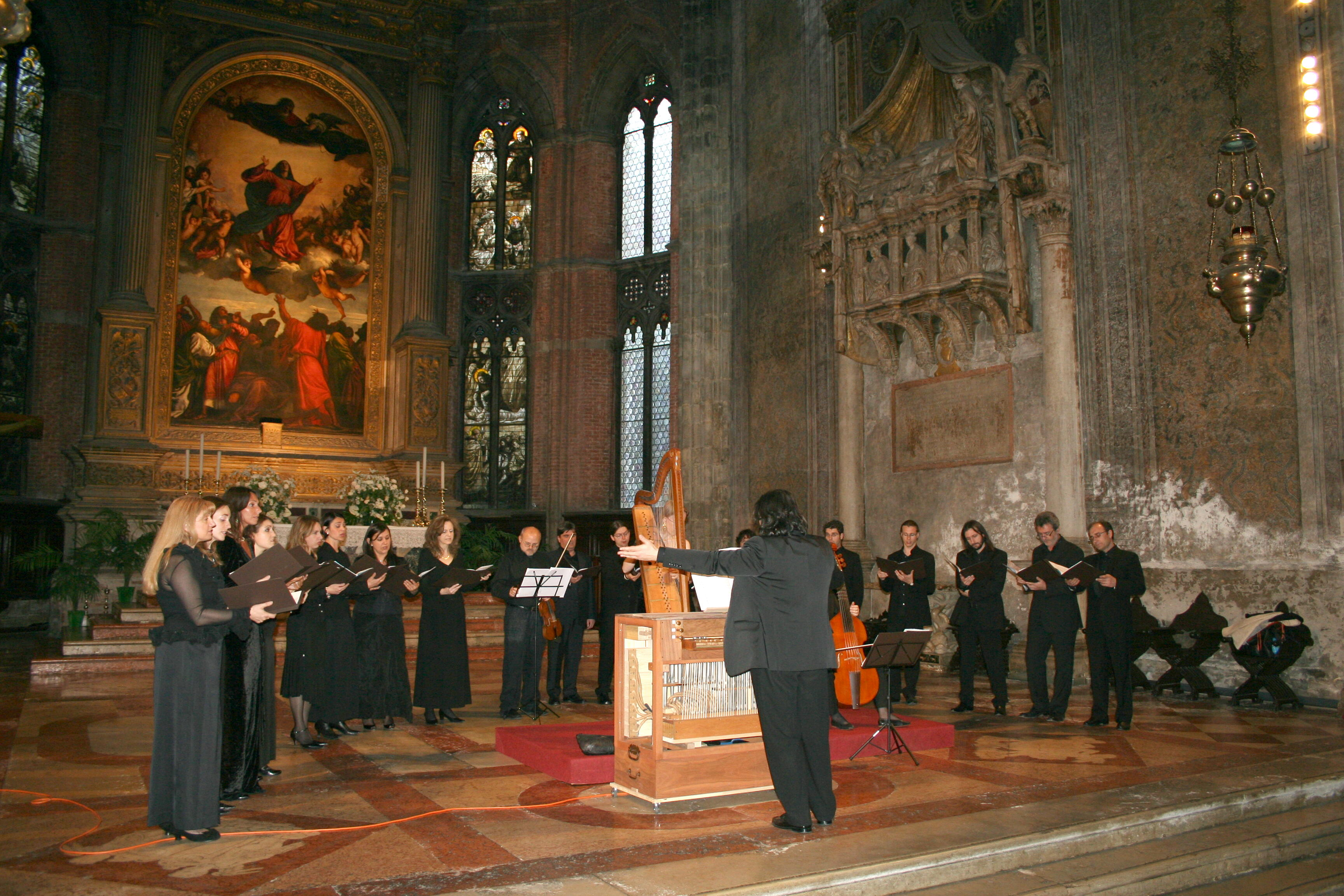
The apse, with a choir for scale. There is normally a rope at the top of the first steps.

== History ==
The Assumption of the Virgin was Titian's first major commission for a church in Venice, and brought his art great public attention. Although he was at work on a huge commission for the Doge's Palace, which he took until the 1530s to complete, most of his previous works were out of public view in palaces. He painted it in situ in the church (perhaps not actually in the final location), and according to Carlo Ridolfi (1594–1658), had to deal with frequent questions from the friars over the size of the figures, which he explained by saying they were necessary for the painting to register from distance. Although many painters had by this time moved to paint on canvas, Titian continued to paint his largest works on wood panels until about 1550, even while using canvas for smaller works. This was painted on a series of 21 wide cedar planks, 3 cm thick, placed horizontally, which can be easily detected when viewing the front of the painting.

Unusually, the public unveiling on 19 May 1518 (a public holiday, chosen to allow a big attendance) was noted by the diarist Marino Sanuto the Younger, though with little detail. The story recorded over a century later by Ridolfi, that the emperor Charles V's ambassador was present at the unveiling ceremony and asked the Franciscans, who were doubtful about the painting's quality, to buy it, so persuading them that it was worth keeping, does not seem to be true as the ambassador was not in Venice at the time.

Nevertheless, there does seem to have been initial hesitation among viewers, if Lodovico Dolce (1508/10–1568), writing some decades later, is to be believed, though his account is rather cast into doubt by his placing the painting several years earlier than it was actually painted. He wrote that "the oafish painters and the foolish masses, who until then had seen nothing but the dead and cold works of Giovanni Bellini, of Gentili, and of Vivarino .... which were without movement or modelling, grossly defamed that picture. Then, as envy cooled and the truth slowly dawned on them, people began to marvel at the new style established in Venice by Titian."

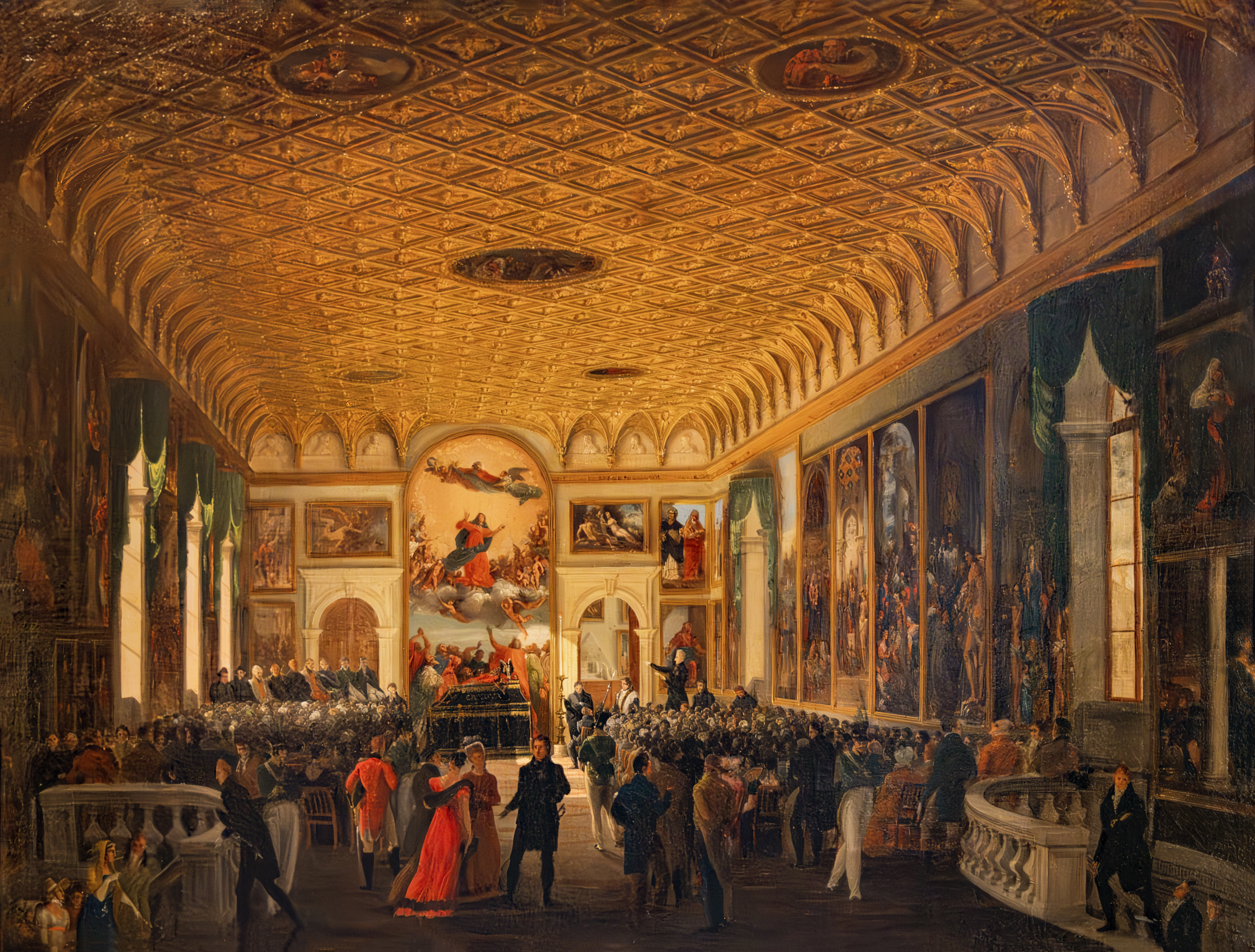
The Assumption in the Accademia in 1822

The placement of the painting over an altar attracted candle grease, and even by the time that Vasari saw it some decades later it was dark and hard to see. Sir Joshua Reynolds in 1752 described it as "most terribly dark but nobly painted", despite two new windows having been added at the side in 1650 to give the painting more light.

In 1817, it was moved to the Accademia, returning to its original place at the Frari in 1919. The ceiling of the gallery had to be raised to accommodate it, and at the opening ceremony in 1822, Canova described it as the greatest painting in the world. Viewing the painting while housed in the Accademia, the young Oscar Wilde remarked that The Assumption was "certainly the best picture in Italy."

According to Nicholas Penny, this "must surely have been the painting by Titian that most influenced" Tintoretto, who may have worked briefly in Titian's studio some years later.

The painting (as Titian planned for) can only be seen by the public from an unusually distant point, as the apse is roped off.

After investigations into the condition of the painting were undertaken in 2012, it was found that the paint was lifting and flaking in small areas, and that non-original layers (discoloured varnish) and residue from previous treatments should be removed. Additionally, the organ pipes that had been reinstalled directly behind the painting in recent decades were found to cause significant vibrations to some sections of the altarpiece, adding further risk to fragile areas. In 2018, officials from the Ministry of Culture authorized the removal of the organ and conservation of the painting began, funded by the non-profit organization Save Venice Inc., began.

"Pietro Edwards, director of the Restoration of the Public Pictures of Venice for many years from 1778 and a crucial figure in the history of conservation, popularised the use of mastic as an easily removable varnish and demanded that retouching be restricted to areas of paint loss. Hayes demonstrates that, when it came to the restoration of Titian's Assunta in 1817, these conservative principles were not strictly adhered to. The sky and the 'glory' were broadly varnished and glazed, altering spatial relations, reducing contrasts and rendering Heaven and Earth more unified. The changes Edwards oversaw (some still present on the painting's surface today) shaped later responses to the work and to Titian himself."

== Style ==
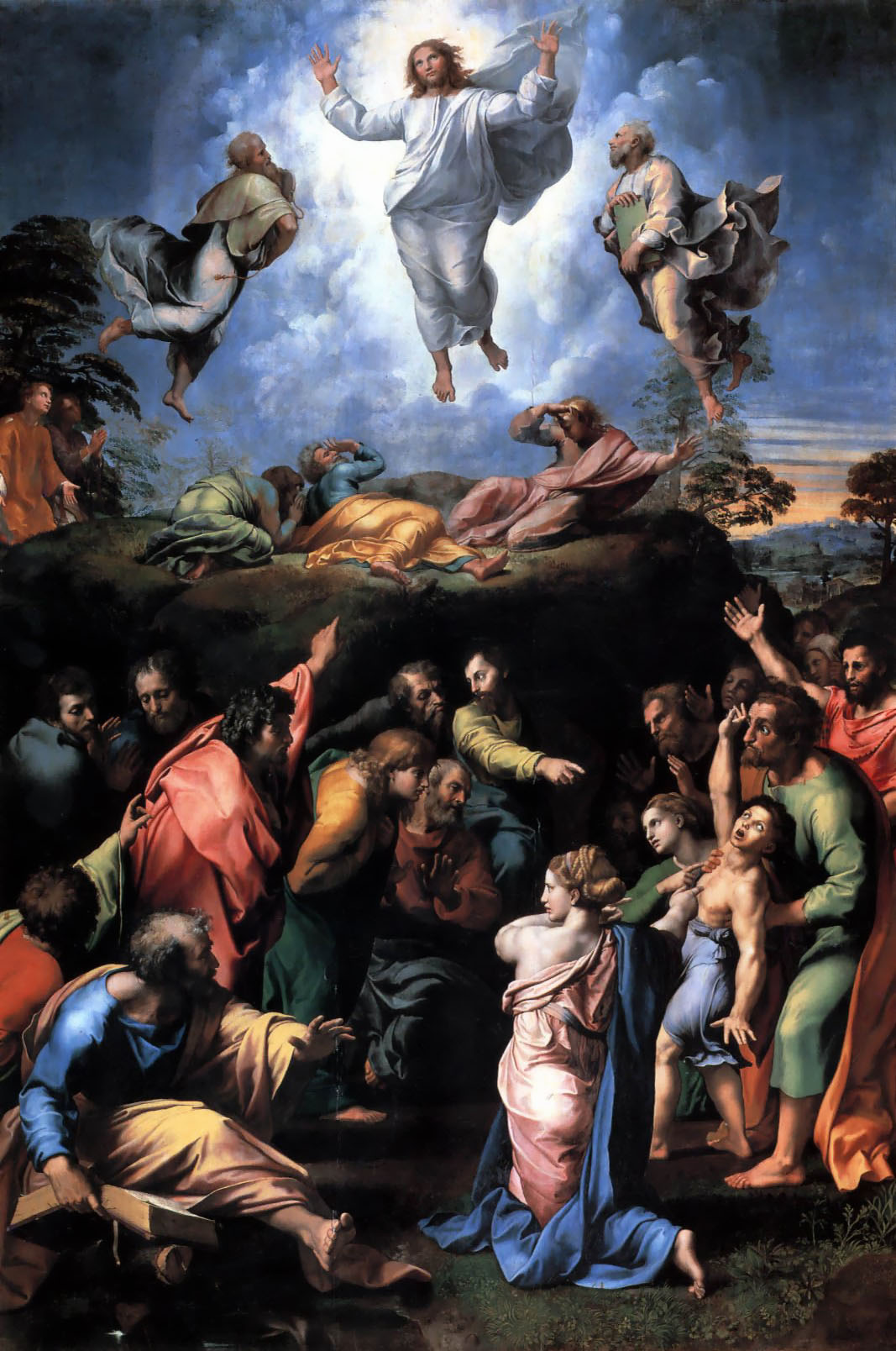
Transfiguration by Raphael, 1517–1520, with which Titian's painting is often compared.

The painting is frequently compared to the Transfiguration by Raphael (now Vatican Pinacoteca), whose period of execution overlapped with Titian's, beginning slightly later, probably in 1517, and soon ending after the artist's death in 1520. The compositions have obvious similarities, with an isolated main figure in the air, and below, a crowd of agitated followers who are not fully lit.

John Steer notes that "Both paintings are, of course, in the grand manner: heroic in scale and conception. A vocabulary of forceful movements and large gestures conveys the sense of morally exalted persons engaged in great events. ... Form and content are one, and both works have that internal balance and organic unity of parts which makes the High Renaissance a normative period in the history of European art."

Differences between them show in their treatment of form: "Each of Raphael's figures is thought of as a separate unit, and brought together they are like group sculpture. Even when only a small part of the body is showing ... the rest of the body is implied, because Raphael's space is so clearly constructed that it creates a vacuum which the figure must be conceived as filling." In contrast, "In the Assumption, the group of Apostles, silhouetted against the sky, is created, by strong cross illumination, from patches of light and shade. So strong is this pattern that when our attention is not deliberately concentrated, the forms are partly lost in it, and it is only by conscious effort that we attach the gesticulating limbs to individual bodies."

For Raphael "form is primary, and colour, light and shadow are only additional elements, added to it. For Titian, on the other hand, light and shade are the revealers of form, and colour the substance from which it is made."

S. J. Freedberg describes the painting as "the first challenge that was adequate to the whole range of artistic resource Titian had by now acquired", and a return to the "passion and force of statement" of Titian's earliest period, "before his partial subjugation to Giorgione". Compared to Raphael's Transfiguration, which "points a way that leads beyond the sphere of classical style, towards the still greater intellectual abstraction and complexity of Mannerism", Titian "points to the possibility of baroque; but it is Titian's option to realize it, and he does not."

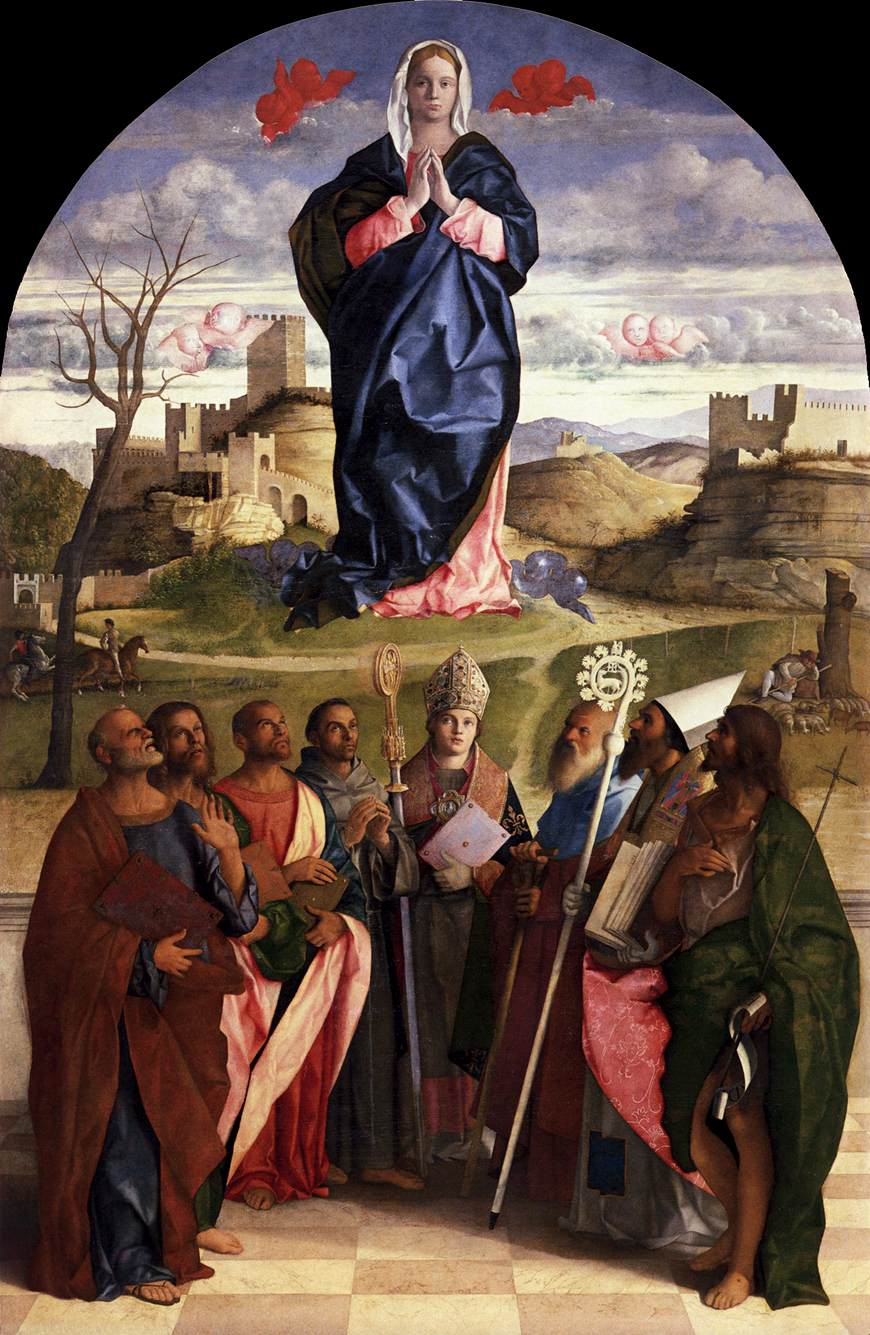
Altarpiece for a church in Murano, Venice, by Giovanni Bellini, 1510–1515.

== See also ==
- Marian art in the Catholic Church
- List of works by Titian
