= Save Venice Inc. =

U.S. non-profit organization

- Established: October 1, 1971
- Focus: art and architecture conservation
- Location: Venice, New York, Boston
- Website: savevenice.org

Save Venice Inc. is a U.S. non-profit organization dedicated to the conservation of art and architecture and the preservation of cultural heritage sites in Venice, Italy. Headquartered in New York City, it has an office in Venice, a chapter in Boston, and supporters across the United States and Europe.

From the outset, the organization's mission has been to provide financial support for conservation treatments of Venice's physical heritage, particularly monuments and important examples of painting, sculpture, and other visual arts. As the organization grew, a secondary emphasis arose in educating the public about Venetian art and history and in training future conservation professionals.

As an organization that primarily funds art restoration and promotes the cultural patrimony of Venice, Save Venice does not take a public position on engineering solutions to acqua alta, such as the MOSE project, or the challenges of overtourism and declining local population. Recent preventive conservation work supported by Save Venice's Immediate Response Fund, created in the aftermath of the November 2019 floods, has however helped many public buildings, including churches, museums, synagogues, and scuole, better prepare for future floods and other disasters.

Save Venice organizes ticketed events, including annual masquerade balls, educational trips and lectures, and biennial galas in Venice to raise funds and awareness for the preservation of Venetian art and architecture. Since its founding in October 1971, Save Venice has sponsored more than 550 restorations of art and architecture in Venice, comprising nearly 2,000 individual artworks.

== History ==
=== Founding (1966–1971) ===
Save Venice Inc. (SVI) was established in the wake of catastrophic storms and flooding in Italy in November 1966, which particularly damaged Florence and Venice. The initial efforts were led by the committee to Rescue Italian Art (CRIA), which brought together donors, art historians, art conservators, and others to conserve damaged and imperiled works of art, architecture, books and manuscripts. Although that committee's work was accomplished quickly, closing its New York office in 1971 and its Florence office by 1973, the organization's efforts had drawn the world's attention to the fragility of Italian artistic treasures and encouraged many others to take up the cause. Recognizing the devastation in Venice, Col. James A. Gray of the International Fund for Monuments (IFM, now the World Monuments Fund) enlisted Professor John McAndrew (1904–1978) an architectural historian at Wellesley College who was particularly concerned about the imminent collapse of historic structures and the decay of paintings and sculptures affected by the floodwater. In February 1969, the Venice Committee of the International Fund for Monuments began writing letters and organizing events to raise money across the United States in order to sponsor restorations of Venetian sites that had suffered artistic damage. Early conservation projects included the Ca'd'Oro and the Scuola Grande di San Giovanni Evangelista. Similar organizations included the Italian Art and Archives Rescue Fund (IAARF, now Venice in Peril) and Italia Nostra. While some groups responding to damage caused by the 1966 floods ceased operation within a few years, such as CRIA, or turned their focus away from Venice, both Save Venice and Venice in Peril, each founded in 1971, remain active nearly a half-century later.

In October 1971, members of the Venice Committee separated from the IFM and created a new organization focused solely on Venice: Save Venice Inc. (SVI). John McAndrew and his wife, Betty Bartlett McAndrew (1906–1986), were joined by art historian Sydney J. Freedberg (1914–1997) of the Fine Arts Department at Harvard University and later Chief Curator of the National Gallery of Art in Washington, D.C. With the assistance of several friends in Boston, they drew up by-laws, created a newsletter, organized cocktail parties and galas to raise funds, and selected monuments and paintings in Venice to be restored. Chapters of SVI were established in Boston, New York, New Orleans, and Washington D.C.; each of them chose restoration projects and raised funds independently. Save Venice is today one of about two dozen members of the International Private Committees for the Safeguarding of Venice, and usually the largest in annual budget.

=== Early years (1971–1985) ===
John McAndrew led the organization until his retirement as SVI President in 1974 and his death in 1978. He was succeeded by Rollin van Nostrand (Bump) Hadley, the director of the Isabella Stewart Gardner Museum in Boston. In an effort to increase its day-to-day presence in Venice, Save Venice hired a local secretary (Maria Luisa Weston) and invited a prominent Venetian (Countess Anna-Maria Cicogna) to join the board of directors. The General Committee grew to include forty members, including John Julius Norwich and Sir Ashley Clarke, both of whom were also leading a sister organization of British supporters, Venice in Peril. Restoration projects in this period included the Scuola Levantina in the Venetian Ghetto, the church of the Gesuiti in Cannaregio, and the cathedral of Santa Maria Assunta on the island of Torcello (the latter in partnership with Venice in Peril and the IFM). Tintoretto's massive Paradise, the largest Old Master painting on canvas in the world, was a significant restoration too, the first of many conservation treatments to benefit this artist. During this period SVI also began to fund local restorers and researchers as well as to support a conservation laboratory run by the Superintendency of Fine Arts.

=== Expansion (1986–2015) ===
The twentieth anniversary of the flood in 1986 marked an important change in the fortunes of Save Venice. Previously a largely volunteer organization, Save Venice moved its headquarters from Boston to New York, employed professional staff, and grew correspondingly. New leadership included Larry Lovett as president, Dr. Randolph Guthrie as treasurer, and Beatrice Guthrie as executive director. Based in New York, but often resident in Venice, this trio would dramatically expand the fundraising capability of Save Venice. Their increased ambition was immediately evident in the proposal to restore the entire church of Santa Maria dei Miracoli, eventually costing $4 million and underway from 1990 to 1997. To make such a huge restoration possible, a new approach to raising funds was needed. SVI created a series of multiday galas held about every two years in Venice. These benefits employed a long-weekend format with lectures, receptions and tours, culminating in a black-tie dinner dance; each gala could net a half a million dollars. Lovett and the Guthries worked closely with Venetians to offer access to private palaces and other behind-the-scenes visits. Combined with corporate sponsorships, commercial endorsements, bequests, and a membership program starting in 2010, Save Venice has often raised more in a year than any of the other private committees devoted to Venice.

The total number of projects underway at one time has steadily increased over the decades, with Save Venice often sponsoring 20-30 projects, in scale from a single painting to an entire building (see below for more on restorations).

A dispute among the board members in 1998 resulted in a walkout of a third of the directors and the creation by Lovett and his allies of a separate organization, Venetian Heritage, based in New York. In subsequent years both organizations have flourished, with somewhat separate restoration foci. The Guthries continued to run Save Venice successfully until their joint retirements in 2006. The biennial galas still take place in Venice, linked to important Venetian festivals such as Carnevale, Regatta Storica, Feast of the Redentore, or the Biennale. Starting in the late 1990s, fundraising trips were offered more frequently and extended beyond the Mediterranean to Russia, Turkey, the Black Sea, Madrid, and cruises on the Elbe and Rhine. Educational efforts have included sponsoring fellowships, lecture series, and conferences. Chapters in Boston and Los Angeles were active in this period, but the most significant fundraising was coordinated by the professionally-staffed offices in New York and Venice. The Ballo in Maschera in New York, originally organized by and for the Young Friends group, grew in size starting in 2011, and soon began to gross one million dollars per year and, more recently, net nearly that amount. The benefit evening has frequently sold out well in advance of the date. Its prominence earned it the reputation as the "little sister" to the Metropolitan Museum's Costume Institute Gala. In 2011, Save Venice Inc. the restoration project of the church of San Sebastiano in Dorsoduro, decorated throughout by the Renaissance painter Paolo Veronese. Between 2010 and 2015, Save Venice Inc. expanded its educational program, including the establishment of the Rosand Library and Study Center in Palazzo Polignac in Venice.

=== Recent years (2016–present) ===
Since 2016 Save Venice Inc. has steadily increased its capacity to raise funds and now embarks on several ambitious restoration projects, of the scale of the church of San Sebastiano, simultaneously. These include a year-long celebration of the quincentennial of the birth of native son Jacopo Tintoretto in 2018 ("Tintoretto 500") with support of Tintoretto exhibitions, publications, and the restoration of some 18 paintings by the artist in Venice. At the same time, Save Venice Inc. adopted conservation of the Saint Ursula cycle in the Accademia Galleries by Vittore Carpaccio and Titian's Madonna di Ca' Pesaro and Assunta in the Church of the Frari.

In response to the terrible floods in Venice of November 2019, SVI took up the invitation of the Italian Ambassador to the United States, Armando Varricchio, to raise money to help Venice. Save Venice thus partnered with the Italian Embassy in Washington to launch the #AmericaLovesVenice campaign with all monies raised going to a newly created "Immediate Response Fund". The more than $700,000 donated to this fund in less than a year enabled work in twenty-two sites in Venice, with particular attention to ground-floor spaces. Actions included rinsing salt deposits from floors and other surfaces, restoring damaged artworks and architecture, including walls and pavements, and better preparing churches, libraries, scuole and other cultural institutions for future floods.

Indicative of the success of Save Venice has been the founding and growth of many other organizations, based in the United States and with largely American supporters, that are also dedicated to art conservation and historic preservation in Europe, such as Venetian Heritage, Friends of Florence and American Friends of the Marciana in Venice.

Increased activity in Denver, Fort Worth/Dallas, and other American cities has also expanded the geographical reach of SVI.

==== 50th anniversary restoration projects ====
In anticipation of its 50th anniversary celebration in October 2021, Save Venice adopted two significant restoration projects, the synagogue in the Ghetto and the cathedral on the island of Torcello. Both campaigns were fully-funded and are approaching completion in spring 2023.

==== Covid pandemic pivot ====
Although conservation projects and in-person fundraising events were temporarily halted by the pandemic, Save Venice recovered quickly. Restoration work resumed in the summer of 2020 with conservators masked and working two meters apart. Meetings and educational programming moved online. Instead of holding a large dinner-dance for several hundred guests, SVI members hosted nearly fifty smaller gatherings to salute the 50th anniversary ("50x50"). When the pandemic diminished, SVI again held its masked ball in New York in April 2022, and a 50th anniversary Gala in Venice in October 2022. All these activities contributed to SVI's strongest financial position in its history, as of 2023.

=== Current activities ===
Building on the momentum of recent years, in 2022-23 SVI approved several major restorations, including additional conservation at the church of Santa Maria e San Donato on the island of Murano, Tintoretto's enormous Crucifixion in the Scuola Grande di San Rocco, and the Room of the Four Doors in the Palazzo Ducale (see below). Recent treatments of three large canvases by Vittore Carpaccio allowed the works to travel to Washington DC for the exhibition Vittore Carpaccio: Master Storyteller of Renaissance Venice (2022).

In 2021 SVI launched a new program, Women Artists of Venice (WAV)), to recover women artists and artisans who were born in or active in Venice in the early modern period. The WAV program has an art conservation track, particularly active with treatments of works by Giulia Lama and Rosalba Carriera, and an art history track to promote and publish research. In 2022 Save Venice formed a partnership with the Istituto Veneto per i Beni Culturali (IVBC) and the Conservatorio Benedetto Marcello to train young restorers while working to restore portions of Palazzo Pisani at Campo Santo Stefano, the largest family palace in Venice.

== Governance ==
=== Presidents ===
- Professor John McAndrew (1971 – 1973)
- Rollin van N. Hadley (1974 – 1985)
- Laurence D. Lovett (1986 – 1989)
- Dr. Randolph H. Guthrie (1990 – 1996)
- Paul F. Wallace (1998 – 2000)
- John H. Dobkin (2001)
- Beatrice Rossi-Landi (2003 – 2006)
- Sarah Schulte (2007 – 2009)
- Matthew White (2010)
- Beatrice Rossi-Landi (2011 – 2016)
- Richard J. Almeida (2016 – 2020)
- Tina Walls (2020 – 2023)
- Charles Tolbert (2023 – present)

=== Chairmen of the Board ===
- Professor John McAndrew (1975 – 1978)
- Rollin van N. Hadley (1986 – 1988)
- Laurence D. Lovett (1989 – 1997)
- Randolph H. Guthrie (1997 – 2006)
- Jesse Robert Lovejoy (2006 – 2010)
- Matthew White (2010 – 2016)
- Frederick Ilchman (2016 – present)

Until 1997 the President was the chief executive while the chairman was an honorary appointment; those roles were reversed when Randolph Guthrie moved from President to chairman. The board of directors is composed of museum curators and conservators, university art historians and historians, financial and legal specialists, and philanthropists from America and Europe. A particular strength has been the presence of esteemed art historians and historians. Over the years, noted scholars on the board have included Sir John Pope-Hennessy, Everett Fahy, Theodore Rabb, David Rosand, and Patricia Fortini Brown.

== Boston chapter ==
Initially known in 1969 as the "New England chapter" of the IFM's Venice Committee, the renamed "Boston chapter" was among the first to follow John McAndrew. The chapter was chaired by Muriel Howells until it officially joined Save Venice in 1971. It has been continuously active since then with a variety of cocktail receptions, masked balls, and other fundraising events; it also hosts an Annual General Meeting for members each fall, and (since 2004) a lecture series each spring. The Consul General of Italy in Boston is traditionally the Honorary Chair.

The Boston chapter has sponsored dozens of restorations, both independently and in collaboration with the New York office. Important conservation treatments include the church of San Giovanni Crisostomo (1972); the Jesuit church of Santa Maria Assunta (1973); Michele Giambono's Saint Chrysogonus in the church of San Trovaso (1974, 2015); the Acritani Pillars (1991 and 2010); Titian's Transfiguration in the church of San Salvador (1995); Supper at Emmaus, attributed to Carpaccio, also in San Salvador (1998); Fra Antonio da Negroponte's Madonna and Child Enthroned in the church of San Francesco della Vigna (2007); Tintoretto's Deposition in the Accademia (2008); Paolo Veronese's Triumph of Mordechai in San Sebastiano (2009); Tintoretto's Saint Martial in Glory (2017); and the Nani ceiling in Ca' Rezzonico (2018–2019).

=== Boston chapter chairs ===
- Rollin van N. Hadley (1971 – 1974)
- Henry S. Lodge (1975 – 76)
- Rodney Armstrong (1977 – 1981)
- Peter Fergusson (1981 – 1986)
- Watson Dickerman (1986 – 1993)
- Ronald L. Fleming (1993 – 1996)
- Donna Hoffman (1996 – 1999)
- Peter Fergusson (1999 – 2001)
- Lucille Spagnuolo (2001 – 2003)
- Juan M. Prieto (2003 – 2009)
- Donald C. Freeman (2009 – 2011)
- Frederick Ilchman (2011 – 2015)
- Richard J. Baiano (2015 – 2021)
- Susan Angelastro (2021 – present)

== Restorations ==
Projects sponsored by Save Venice are limited to art and architecture belonging to public institutions: typically museums, churches, scuole, synagogues, libraries, public sculpture, and the like. Art that is privately owned is not eligible. In selecting potential restoration projects, the goal has been to conserve a wide range of media (architecture, painting, sculpture, decorative arts, rare books, archives, etc.) in all neighborhoods of the city, and from different chronological periods.

Restoration projects are selected by the Projects Committee, composed of a dozen art experts, and presented to the board for approval at the three meetings each year. Whenever possible, projects are visited in person in Venice by the full board to inspect condition, survey imminent damage, and discuss proposed treatments with restorers, curators, and officials from the Superintendencies of Fine Arts and Monuments. Potential projects are suggested by government agencies, museums, churches, academics, and friends. Restorations are executed by trained conservators under the supervision of specialists in the Italian Superintendencies of Fine Arts and Monuments.

Save Venice now undertakes an average of more than thirty restorations per year, though the number of projects in a single year can total more than fifty.

=== Completed conservation treatments ===
Among the most significant or largest restoration projects have been:

- Madonna Nicopeia, Basilica San Marco (1969)
- Michele Giambono, Saint Chrysogonus on Horseback, San Trovaso (1974, 2015)
- Negroponte Altarpiece, San Francesco della Vigna (1976, 2008)
- Titian's Madonna di Ca' Pesaro, Santa Maria Gloriosa dei Frari (1978, 2013–2014, 2016–2017)
- Santa Maria dei Miracoli (1990–1997)
- Pillars of Acre, Piazzetta San Marco (1991, 2010)
- Giovanni Bellini, Polyptych of Saint Vincent Ferrer, Santi Giovanni e Paolo (1994)
- Pala Feriale (cover for the Pala d'Oro) by Paolo Veneziano, Basilica San Marco (1995)
- Badoer-Giustinian Chapel, San Francesco della Vigna (1999)
- Scuola Grande di San Marco façade (2000–2005)
- San Sebastiano, including the decorative cycles by Paolo Veronese (multiple projects, 2006 – present)
- Sala dell'Albergo, Scuola della Carità (Accademia), with its golden ceiling and Titian's Presentation of the Virgin in the Temple (2010–2012)
- Saint Ursula cycle by Carpaccio (2016–2019)
- Ca' d'Oro's mosaic floor (2018)
- Tintoretto 500 anniversary year, which included the restoration of 18 Tintoretto paintings in Venice, the artist's tomb, and support for multiple exhibitions, educational initiatives, and publications (2018)
- Titian, Assumption of the Virgin (Santa Maria Gloriosa dei Frari) (2018–2022)
- Vittore Carpaccio, narrative cycle (including St. George and the Dragon and St. Augustine in His Study), Scuola di San Giorgio degli Schiavoni (2019–2022)
- Torcello Cathedral, 3rd and 4th apse
- Vittore Carpaccio, Miracle at the Ponte di Rialto (Accademia) (December 2019-Autumn 2021)

=== Conservation treatments in progress ===
Some of the major projects currently underway:

- Paolo Veneziano, Santa Chiara Polyptych (Accademia) (2020, under pre-restoration analysis)
- Church of Santa Maria e San Donato's mosaic floor, central apse mosaics and structural repair of the roof (previous treatments in 1974-1978 and 2012–2015; 2020, IRF campaign)
- Tintoretto's Crucifixion in the Scuola Grande di San Rocco
- The Room of the Four Doors in the Palazzo Ducale

== Rosand Library & Study Center ==
The Rosand Library and Study Center was established in 2014 with books bequeathed by David Rosand (1938–2014), professor of art history at Columbia University and Save Venice board member. His 4500 volumes, with particular strength on the history and art of Venice, form the library's core. Although considerably smaller than Venice's large art history libraries, such as those of the Correr Museum or Cini Foundation, the Rosand Library offers an emphasis on English language titles and art conservation. Additionally, the holdings include restoration files, which document nearly five decades of conservation projects, as well as the photographic archives of restorations. The library is open to readers by appointment. All of the books are available for browsing but do not circulate.

The establishment and organization of the library was headed by Mary E. Frank, then chair of the Save Venice Educational Resources Committee. With the cooperation of Ellen Rosand, David's widow, Frank oversaw the cataloguing of the books in New York and their move to Save Venice's Venetian office in Palazzo Contarini Polignac.

By hosting events such as Research & Restoration Roundtables and book presentations, the library serves as a location for students and scholars to collaborate in the study of Venetian art.

On June 18, 2015, the official inauguration of the Rosand Library & Study Center took place.

== Activities and special events ==
=== Educational programming ===
Save Venice offers a variety of educational programming through lectures, panel discussions, exhibitions, tours, publications, conferences, and fellowships and internships. Events take place in New York, Boston, Venice, and throughout the U.S., including Los Angeles, San Diego, Denver, Chicago, Houston, and Fort Worth/Dallas.

Lectures are often held at the Rosand Library & Study Center (Venice); NYU's Casa Italiana Zerilli-Marimò and the Italian Cultural Institute (NYC); and Back Bay's historic Chilton Club (Boston). The lectures at New York and Boston locations are given in English, while the lectures held in Venice are usually in Italian.

Works of art whose restoration was sponsored by Save Venice are frequently included in art exhibitions. Often the organization subsidizes the costs of putting on the exhibition itself. Some such exhibitions include "I Veronese di San Sebastiano," at the Palazzo Grimani (2015); "Aldo Manuzio. Il Rinascimento di Venezia," at the Galleria dell'Accademia (2016); "Il Paradiso riconquistato, Trame d'oro e colore nella pittura di Michele Giambono," at the Galleria dell'Accademia, Venice (2016–2017); "Tintoretto 1519-1594," at the Palazzo Ducale, Venice (2018–2019); and "Tintoretto: Artist of Renaissance Venice," at the National Gallery of Art, Washington, D.C. (2019), Vittore Carpaccio, "Master Storyteller of Renaissance Venice," at the Palazzo Ducale, Venice (2022), and at the National Gallery of Art, Washington, D.C. (2023).

The exhibition "Art, Faith and Medicine in Tintoretto's Venice," at the Scuola Grande di San Marco, Venice (2018–2019), was entirely organized and funded by Save Venice as part of the year-long "Tintoretto 500" celebration.

Other educational efforts include publications and the support of local conservation education programs. Save Venice supports like-minded Italian institutions, for example providing annual grants to the Istituto Veneto per i Beni Culturali art conservation school and the Titian Study Center in Pieve di Cadore. Save Venice has been an affiliate member of the Renaissance Society of America (RSA) since 2018 and regularly organizes a panel of scholarly presentations for the RSA's annual meeting.

=== Video presentations ===
Save Venice has produced a number of documentary shorts discussing the organization's history, current projects, and related historical and cultural topics.

==== Selected shorts ====
- "Why Save Venice?," chairman Frederick Ilchman talks about the mission and history of Save Venice and current conservation priorities (May 12, 2020).
- "A Love Letter to Venice," documentary short film narrated by Jeremy Irons (October 29, 2020).

==== Ongoing video series ====
"#SVFavorites" asks experts to talk about their favorite restorations, past and present.

- "Vittore Carpaccio's Lion of Saint Mark," Xavier F. Salomon, Save Venice Board member and Peter Jay Sharp Chief Curator at The Frick Collection (May 18, 2020).
- "Titian's Madonna di Ca' Pesaro Altarpiece in the Basilica dei Frari," C.D. Dickerson, Save Venice Board Member and head of sculpture and decorative arts at the National Gallery of Art in Washington, D.C. (May 25, 2020).

"#SVPresents" includes talks on art historical research, exhibitions, educational initiatives, and updates on conservation projects.

- "Discovering Torcello: How Archeology is Rewriting Venice's Origins," archaeologist Diego Calaon (July 23, 2020).
- "Jacopo Tintoretto's Saint Martial in Glory Altarpiece," Claire Barry, director of conservation at the Kimbell Art Museum and Save Venice Projects Committee Member (September 1, 2020).

=== Fundraising events ===
A biennial four-day fundraising gala is held in Venice, usually taking as its theme a Venetian celebration or cultural event such as Carnival, the Biennale, or Regatta Week.

An annual masquerade ball occurs in New York City as a black-tie fundraising dinner that promotes Venetian art and culture.

The Boston chapter has hosted a number of costume balls, black-tie dinners, and a variety of fundraising events at venues like the Boston Public Library and the Algonquin Club.

The Young Friends of Save Venice is a division of the organization that involves young supporters (up to the age of 39 years old) in planning and fundraising efforts. To date, the group has helped raise more than five million dollars for restorations in Venice.

== Publications ==
- Christopher Carlsmith, Save Venice Inc.: American Philanthropy and Art Conservation in Italy, 1966-2021 (Amherst and Boston: University of Massachusetts, 2022).
- Gabriele Matino and Patricia Fortini Brown, Carpaccio in Venice. A Guide (Venice: Marsilio Editori, 2020).
- Gabriele Matino and Cynthia Klestinec, eds., Art, Faith and Medicine in Tintoretto's Venice (Venice: Marsilio Editori, 2018).
- Thomas Dalla Costa, Robert Echols, Frederick Ilchman, eds., Tintoretto in Venice: A Guide (Venice: Marsilio Editori, 2018).
- Melissa Conn and David Rosand, eds., Save Venice Inc: Four Decades of Restoration in Venice (Venice and New York: Save Venice Inc., 2011).
- Giulio Manieri Elia, ed., Masterpieces Restored: the Gallerie dell'Accademia and Save Venice Inc. (Venice: Marsilio Editori, 2010).
- Peter Fergusson, "Save Venice: The First Forty Years" (privately printed for the Boston Chapter of Save Venice, 2009).

== See also ==
- The City of Falling Angels
- Venice in Peril Fund
