= Legend of Saint Ursula =

Painting series by Vittore Carpaccio

Arrival of the Ambassadors
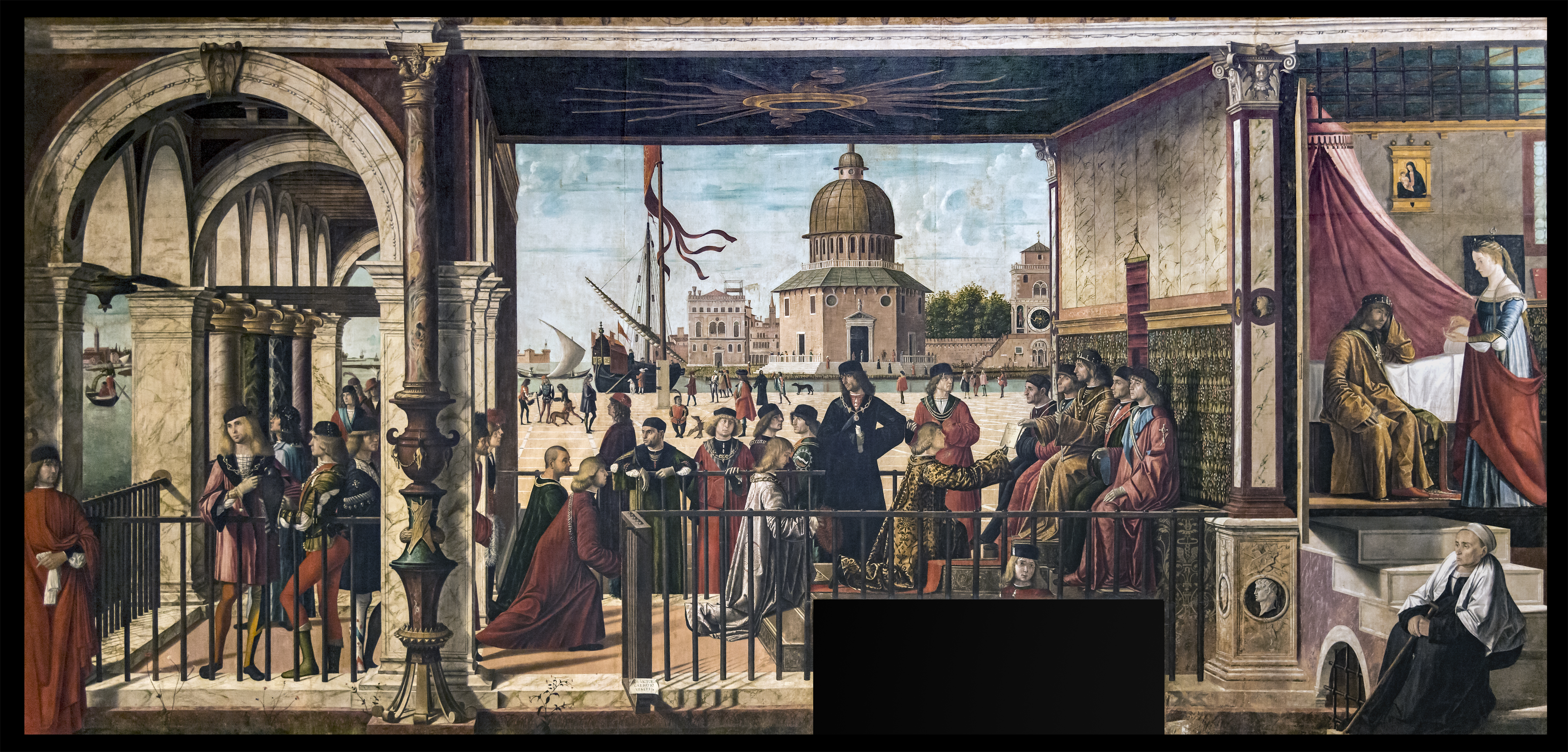
- Artist: Vittore Carpaccio
- Year: 1497–1498
- Medium: Tempera on canvas
- Dimensions: 378 cm × 589 cm (149 in × 232 in)
- Location: Gallerie dell'Accademia, Venice

Departure of the Ambassadors
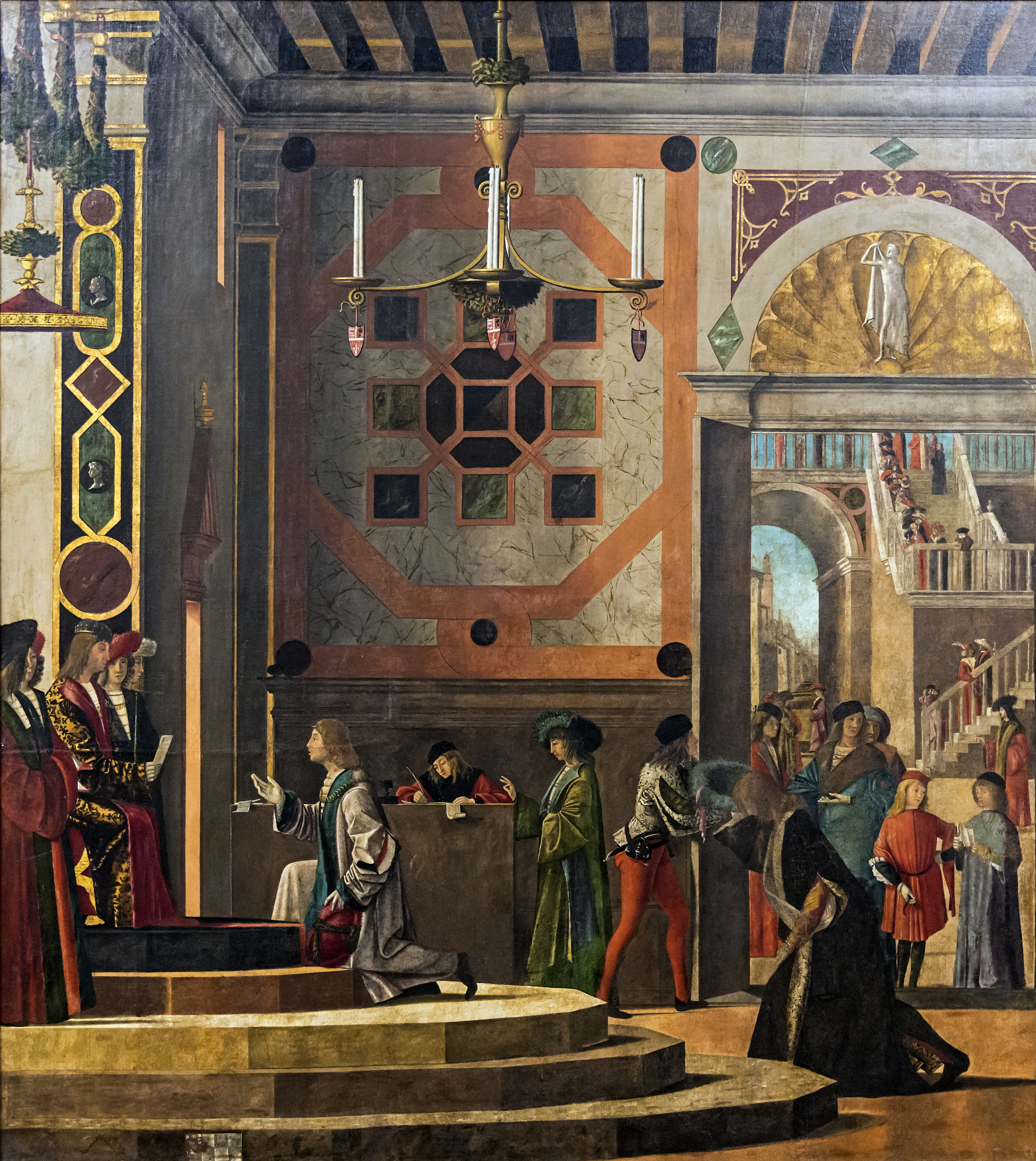
- Artist: Vittore Carpaccio
- Year: 1497–1498
- Medium: oil on canvas
- Dimensions: 281 cm × 252 cm (111 in × 99 in)
- Location: Gallerie dell'Accademia, Venice

Return of the Ambassadors
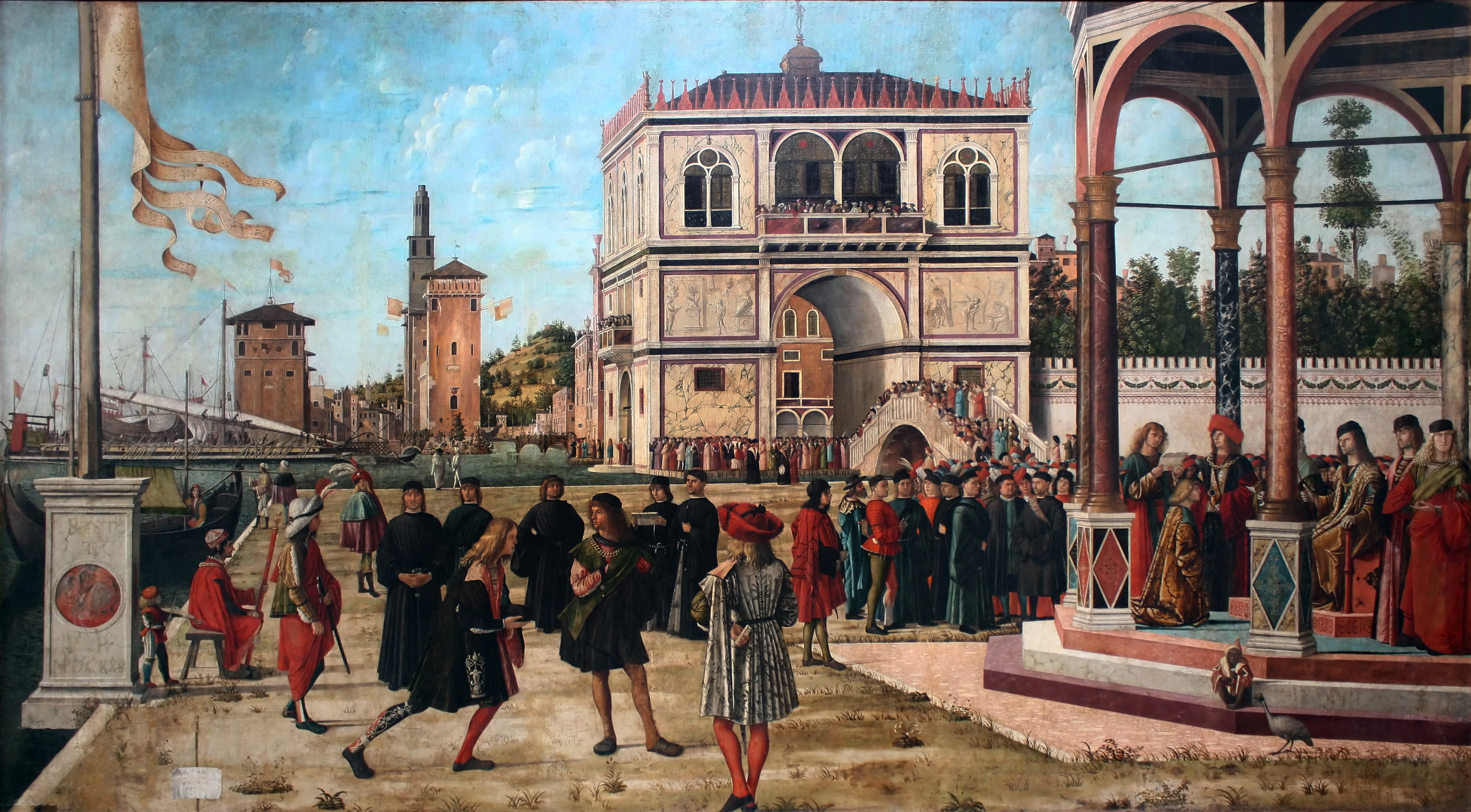
- Artist: Vittore Carpaccio
- Year: 1497–1498
- Medium: oil on canvas
- Dimensions: 297 cm × 527 cm (117 in × 207 in)
- Location: Gallerie dell'Accademia, Venice

The Meeting of Ursula and the Prince
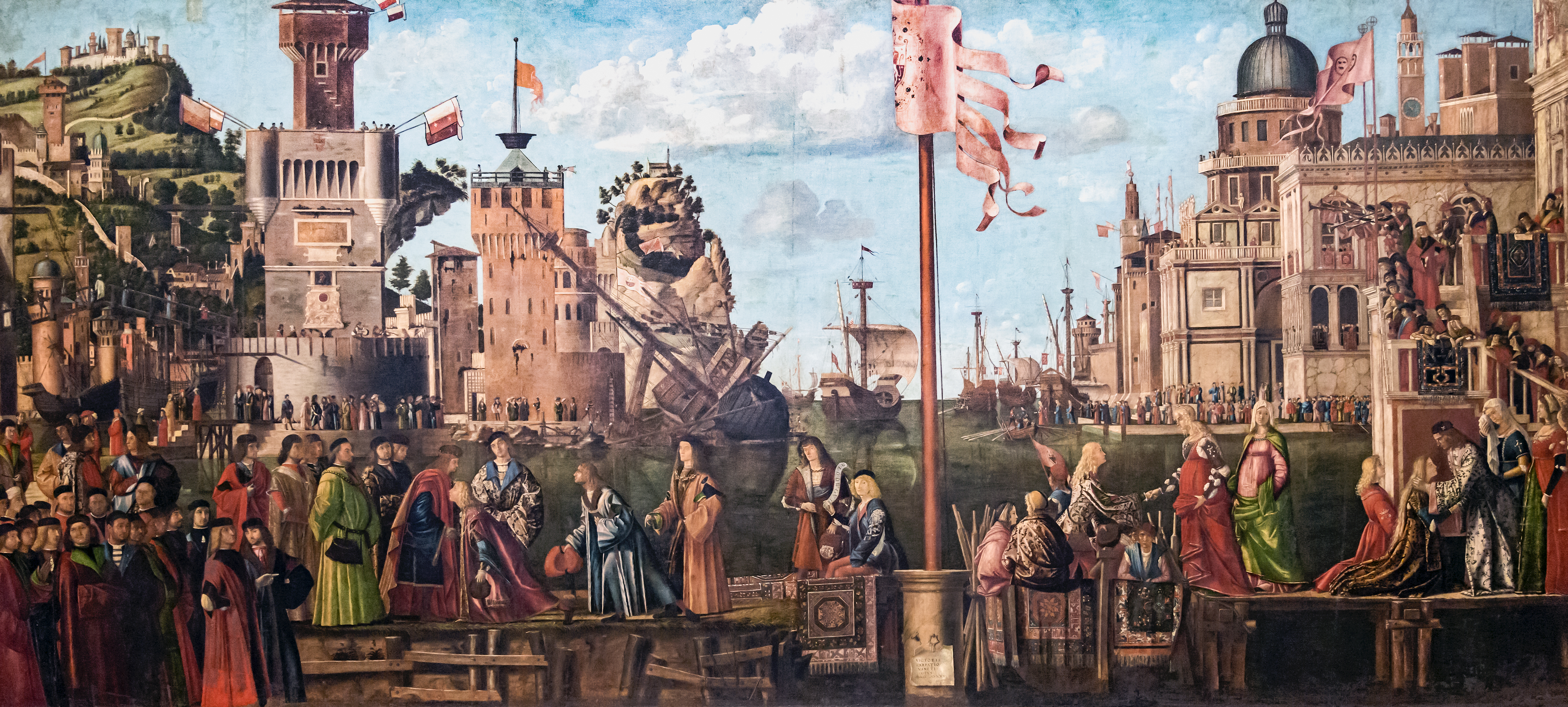
- Artist: Vittore Carpaccio
- Year: 1497–1498
- Medium: oil on canvas
- Dimensions: 279 cm × 610 cm (110 in × 240 in)
- Location: Gallerie dell'Accademia, Venice

The Meeting of the Pilgrims with the Pope
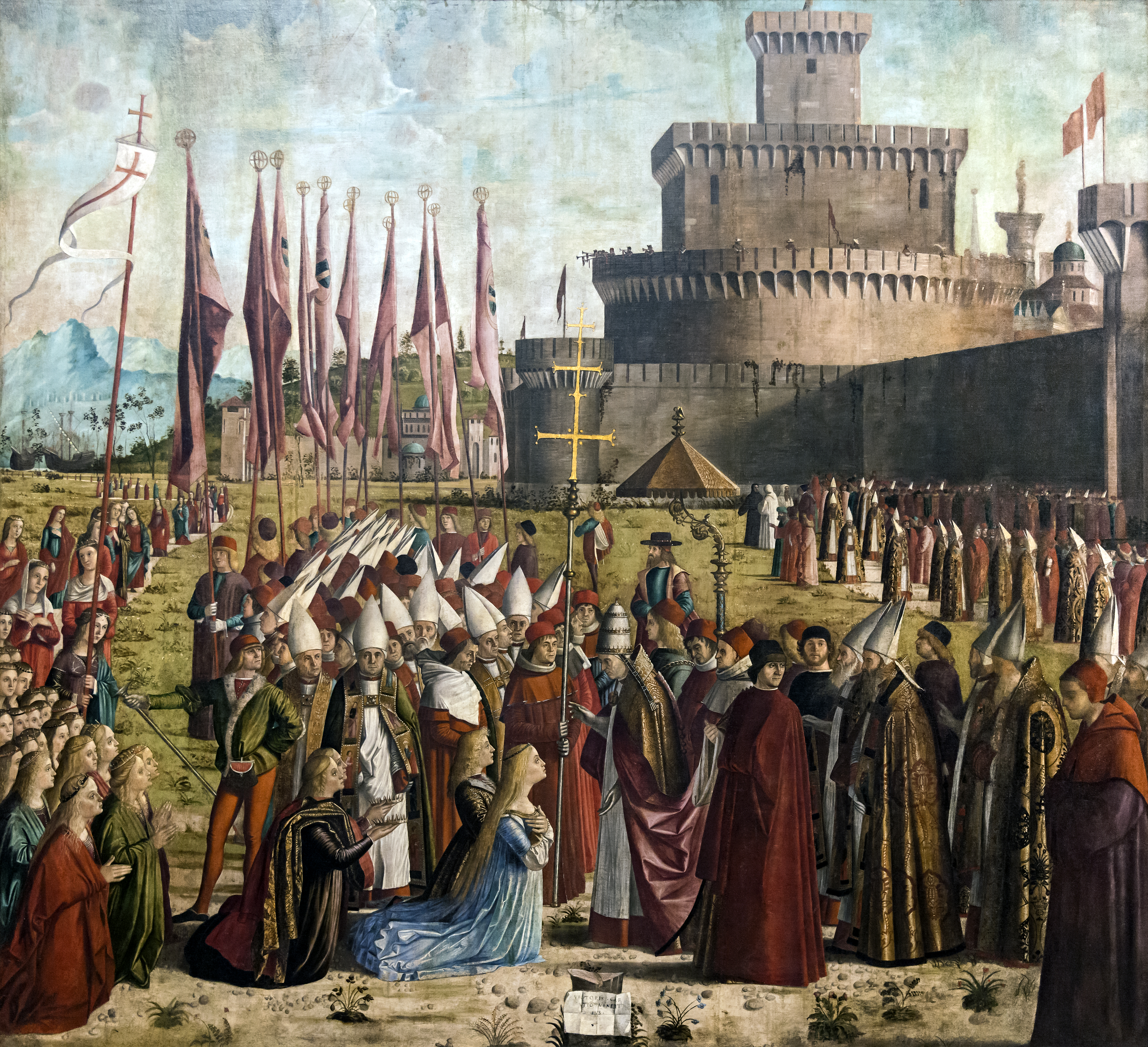
- Artist: Vittore Carpaccio
- Year: 1497–1498
- Medium: oil on canvas
- Dimensions: 279 cm × 305 cm (110 in × 120 in)
- Location: Gallerie dell'Accademia, Venice

The Saint's Dream
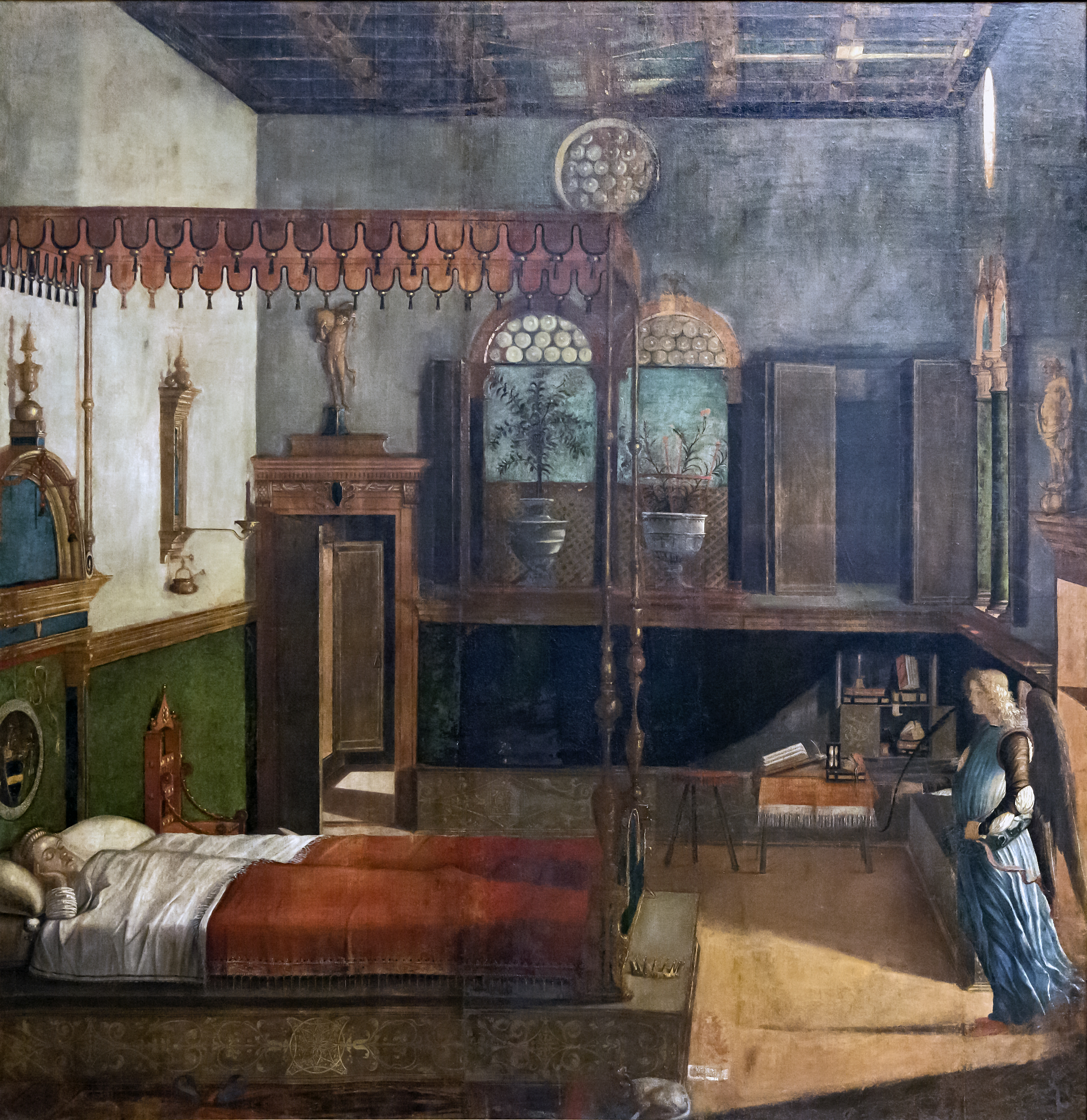
- Artist: Vittore Carpaccio
- Year: 1497–1498
- Medium: oil on canvas
- Dimensions: 273 cm × 267 cm (107 in × 105 in)
- Location: Gallerie dell'Accademia, Venice

Arrival of the Pilgrims at Cologne
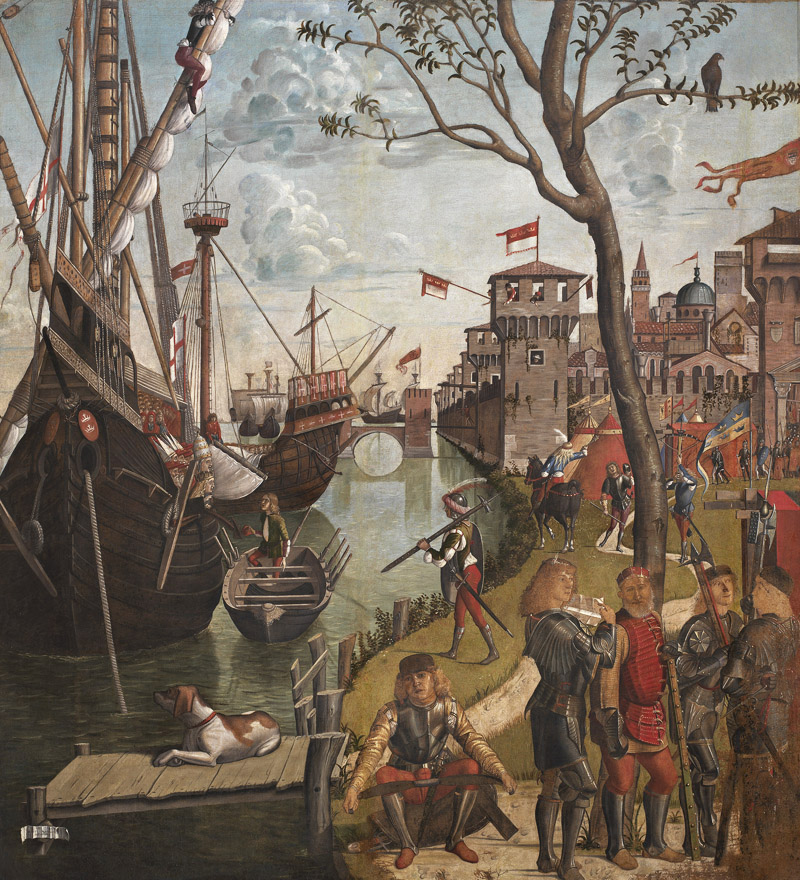
- Artist: Vittore Carpaccio
- Year: 1490
- Medium: oil on canvas
- Dimensions: 279 cm × 254 cm (110 in × 100 in)
- Location: Gallerie dell'Accademia, Venice

The Martyrdom and the Funeral of St. Ursula
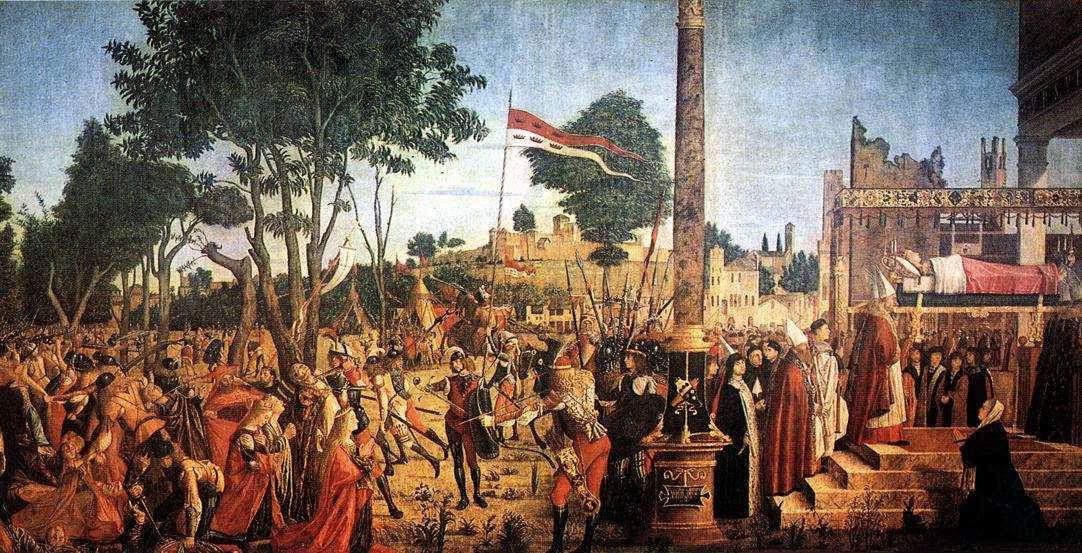
- Artist: Vittore Carpaccio
- Year: 1497–1498
- Medium: oil on canvas
- Dimensions: 268 cm × 520 cm (106 in × 200 in)
- Location: Gallerie dell'Accademia, Venice

Glory of St. Ursula
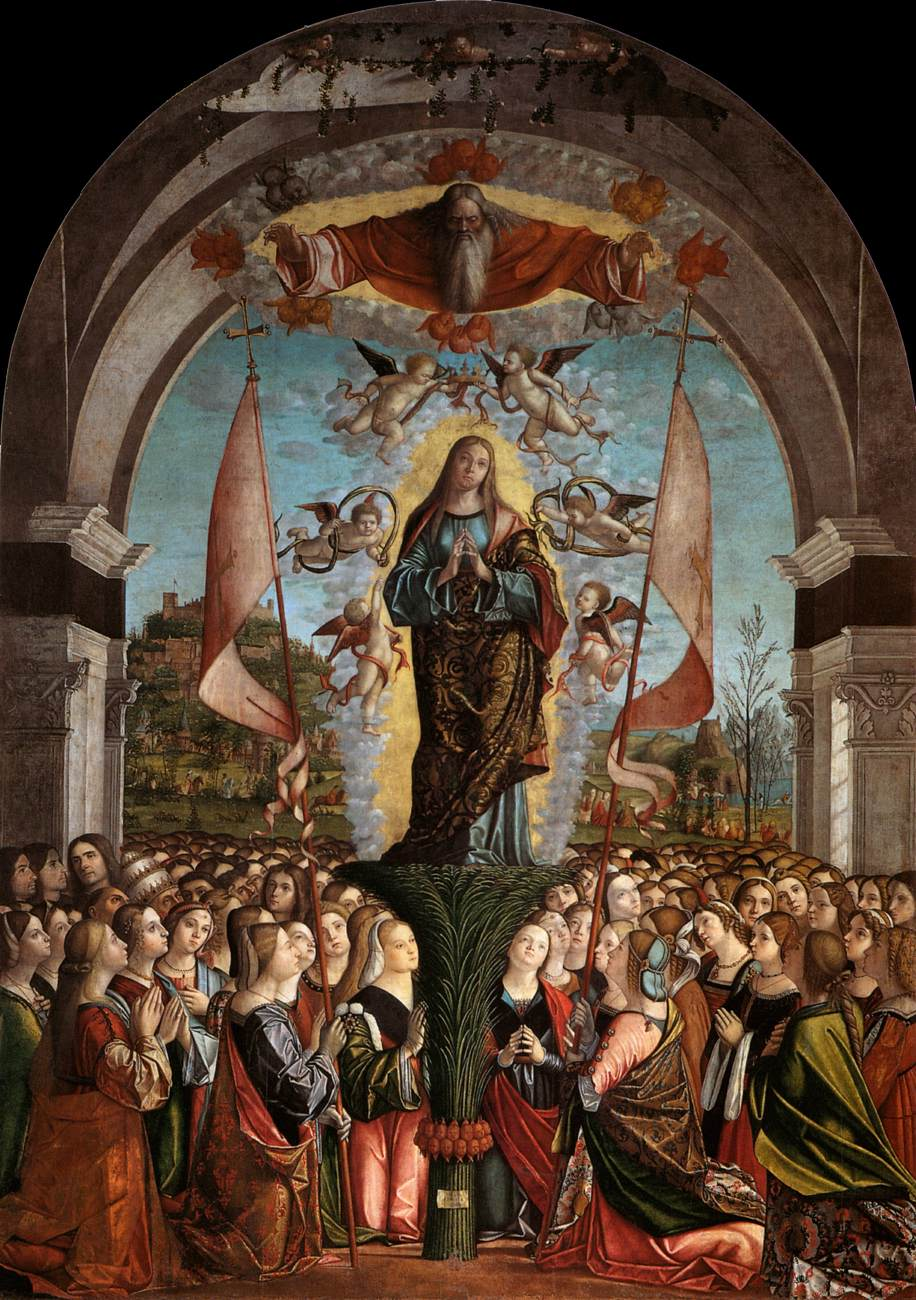
- Artist: Vittore Carpaccio
- Location: Gallerie dell'Accademia, Venice

The Legend of Saint Ursula (Italian: Storie di sant'Orsola) is a series of nine large wall-paintings on canvas by the Italian Renaissance artist Vittore Carpaccio, commissioned by the Loredan family and originally created for the Scuola di Sant'Orsola (Ursula) in Venice, which was under their patronage. They are now in the Gallerie dell'Accademia in Venice.

== Description ==
=== Background ===
The paintings were commissioned by the Loredan family, who had the Scuola of St. Ursula under their patronage and who had been distinguished for their military deeds against the "infidel" Ottomans, which are repeatedly echoed in the panels of the cycle. This was not one of the six Scuole Grandi of Venice, but a similar confraternity.

According to Jacobus de Voragine's Golden Legend, Saint Ursula was the daughter of the Christian king of Brittany, who was betrothed to a pagan prince in exchange to his conversion to Christianity and they both made a pilgrimage to Rome. On her way back home, at Cologne, she was martyred by Attila, King of the Huns, together with her following of 11,000 virgins, after she had refused to become his wife.

=== Arrival of the Ambassadors ===
The first two paintings, despite depicting the first events of the cycle, were the last to be painted, in 1497–1498.

The first painting is set in an open pavilion, and its scene, divided into three parts, is read from right to left. The scene is reminiscent of the liturgical drama of the period, where all the characters sat on the stage and stood up when they had to take part in the play. On the right Ursula and her father are portrayed talking; sitting on the first step of a staircase leading to the interior is her nurse.

The central scene portrays the meeting between the king and the ambassadors. In the background is a centrally planned temple and other imaginary buildings, resembling those of contemporary Venice. On the left, in the foreground under a loggia, is a marine panorama with a galleon. Outside the proscenium is a man wearing a red toga, a hint at the didascalos, a narrator figure of the Renaissance theatre who described or commented on the play to the audience, usually in the person of an angel. Among the spectators are characters wearing the crest of the Compagnia della Calza, a Venetian confraternity which organized events and spectacles during Carnival and other religious celebrations.

=== The Departure of the Ambassadors ===
The second painting, smaller in size, depicts, in a sumptuous interior, another court meeting, usually described as the parting of the ambassadors from the king of Brittany. A scribe in the background is writing the reply for Ursula's prince. According to a different interpretation the clothes of the figures indicate that they are pagans, and thus the characters would be part of the Brittany court, with the ambassadors leaving for their mission.

=== The Return of the Ambassadors ===
The third painting portrays the ambassadors of Brittany received in an open pavilion, with an imaginary city in the background, also resembling contemporary Venetian architecture.

=== The Meeting of Ursula and the Prince ===
The painting is divided in two by a pennant. Immediately at its left, sitting on a parapet, is Antonio Loredan, member of the Compagnia della Calza and commissioner of the work. The division allowed Carpaccio to portray two different landscapes: on the left is Brittany (England) with castles and steep cliffs, with the prince parting from his father; on the right is the meeting of the betrothed, and her separation from her father. In the background is the departure for the pilgrimage, with an imaginary Breton/British city characterized by Renaissance and Venetian edifices.

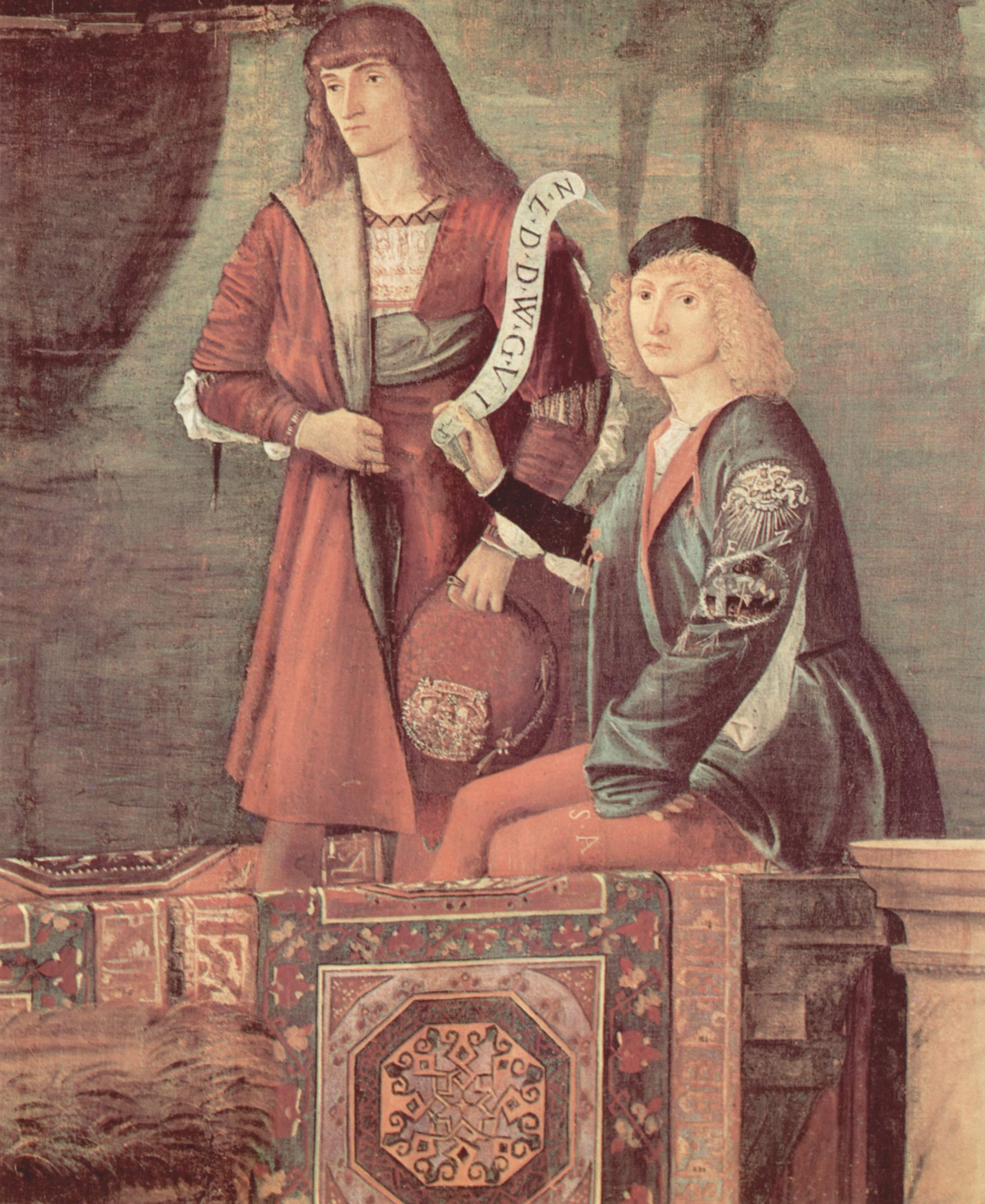
Detail of the Meeting of Ursula and the Prince.

=== Meeting of the Pilgrims with the Pope ===
The prince respects the pact with St. Ursula, accompanying her in pilgrimage to Rome. Here, outside the city's walls, the pilgrims are welcomed by the Pope, who will baptize the pagan prince and crown the spouses. Here too the ceremonial is reminiscent of the Venetian ones, and the didascalos is also present next to the Pope, in a red toga and with the appearance of the Renaissance humanist Ermolao Barbaro.

=== The Saint's Dream ===
The canvas illustrates the saint sleeping in the nuptial bed, alone, an allusion to the impossibility of the marriage. While she is sleeping, an angel enters the room while a rose sunray illuminates it. The angel is carrying the news of her upcoming martyrdom.

The interior is portrayed with notable realism, such as in the furniture and the flowers: the latter, a myrtle and a carnation, symbolize faithfulness in the marriage. The inscription DIVA FAUSTA, located under Hercules's statue, indicates the redemptive nature of the divine message.

The angel brings purity and clears the saint's mind.

=== Arrival of the Pilgrims in Cologne ===
This painting is dated 1490, and is the first executed by Carpaccio for the cycle. It describes the arrival of the pilgrims, accompanied by the Pope, at Cologne, then under siege by the Huns. The banners over the tower, red-white with three golden crowns, are those of the Ottoman sultan Mehmet II, the main Venetian enemy during Carpaccio's life. The three crowns allude to the lands under his rule: Asia, Trabzon and Greece.

=== The Martyrdom and the Funeral of St. Ursula ===
A column in the middle of the painting, bearing the Loredan family's coat of arms, divides it into two scenes: on the left is the martyrdom of St. Ursula and her following of 11,000 virgins; on the right, her funeral. As in the previous painting, Mehmet II and his troops are depicted as Huns, with the exception of a Moorish soldier in the middle of the left scene.

=== Glory of St. Ursula ===
This canvas was originally located in the Scuola's chapel, concluding the narration in the cycle. Ursula is depicted in the presence of God, over a bundle of palms (symbol of martyrdom), surrounded by her companions. Six seraphims are surrounding her with crowns. On the left are three male characters, most likely Antonio Loredan's three sons. Loredan had defended Shkodër in Albania against the Turks; his deed is recalled by the castle in the background.

== Conservation ==
The cycle has undergone numerous restoration treatments, the first one during Carpaccio's own lifetime and then continuing with one or two treatments each subsequent century. These (sometimes partial) restorations contributed to an uneven surface of the paintings and compromised the unity of the cycle. The nine canvases were covered with old varnish, glues, and retouching oil that had given the paintings a yellow-green hue. Over the years, several canvases had also suffered water damage while on the north wall of the Scuola.

In 2010, the organization Save Venice Inc. launched a conservation campaign for the St. Ursula cycle. First preliminary research and diagnostic analysis was undertaken by the Istituto Superiore per la Conservazione e il Restauro and the Laboratorio Scientifico delle Gallerie.

A pilot restoration on The Arrival of the Pilgrims in Cologne began in 2013, followed by the closing of the Saint Ursula room in the Accademia in August of 2016 to continue work on the rest of the paintings. In total, conservators treated more than 87 square meters of painted canvas and averaged 250 hours of work per each square meter. The reinstallation of the restored paintings was celebrated in June 2019.
