= Pesaro Madonna =

Painting by Titian

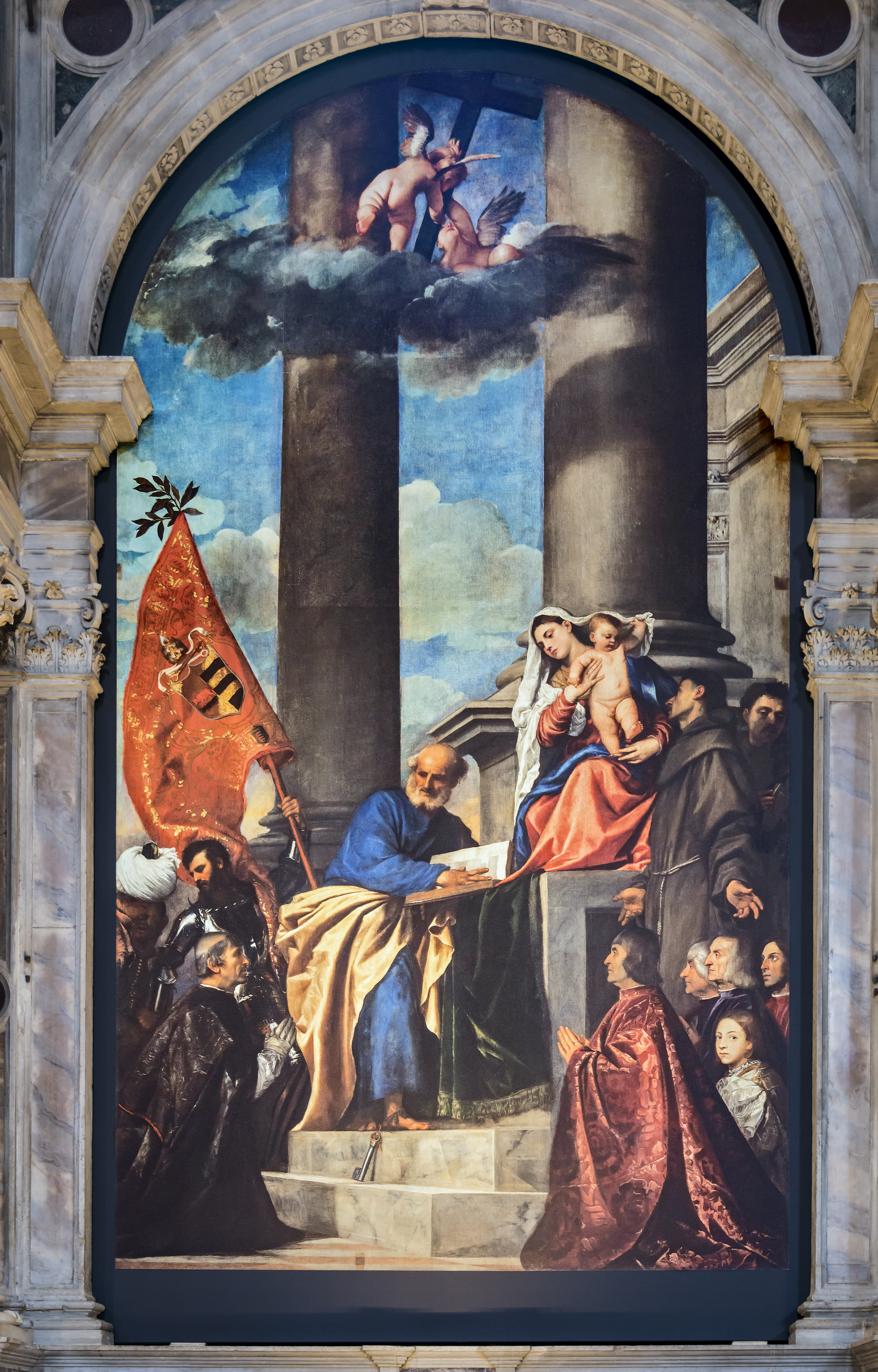
- Replica of Titian's original painting displayed during restoration
- Artist: Titian
- Year: 1519-1526
- Medium: Oil on canvas
- Dimensions: 4.88 m × 2.69 m (16.0 ft × 8.8 ft)
- Location: Santa Maria Gloriosa dei Frari, Venice

The Pesaro Madonna (Italian: Pala Pesaro) (better known as the Madonna di Ca' Pesaro) is a painting by the late Italian Renaissance master Titian, commissioned by Jacopo Pesaro, whose family acquired in 1518 the chapel in the Frari Basilica in Venice for which the work was painted, and where it remains today. Jacopo was Bishop of Paphos, in Cyprus, and had been named commander of the papal fleet by the Borgia pope, Alexander VI. This painting recalls one of Titian's earliest paintings, Jacopo Pesaro being presented by Pope Alexander VI to Saint Peter, c. 1510-11

== Aesthetics ==
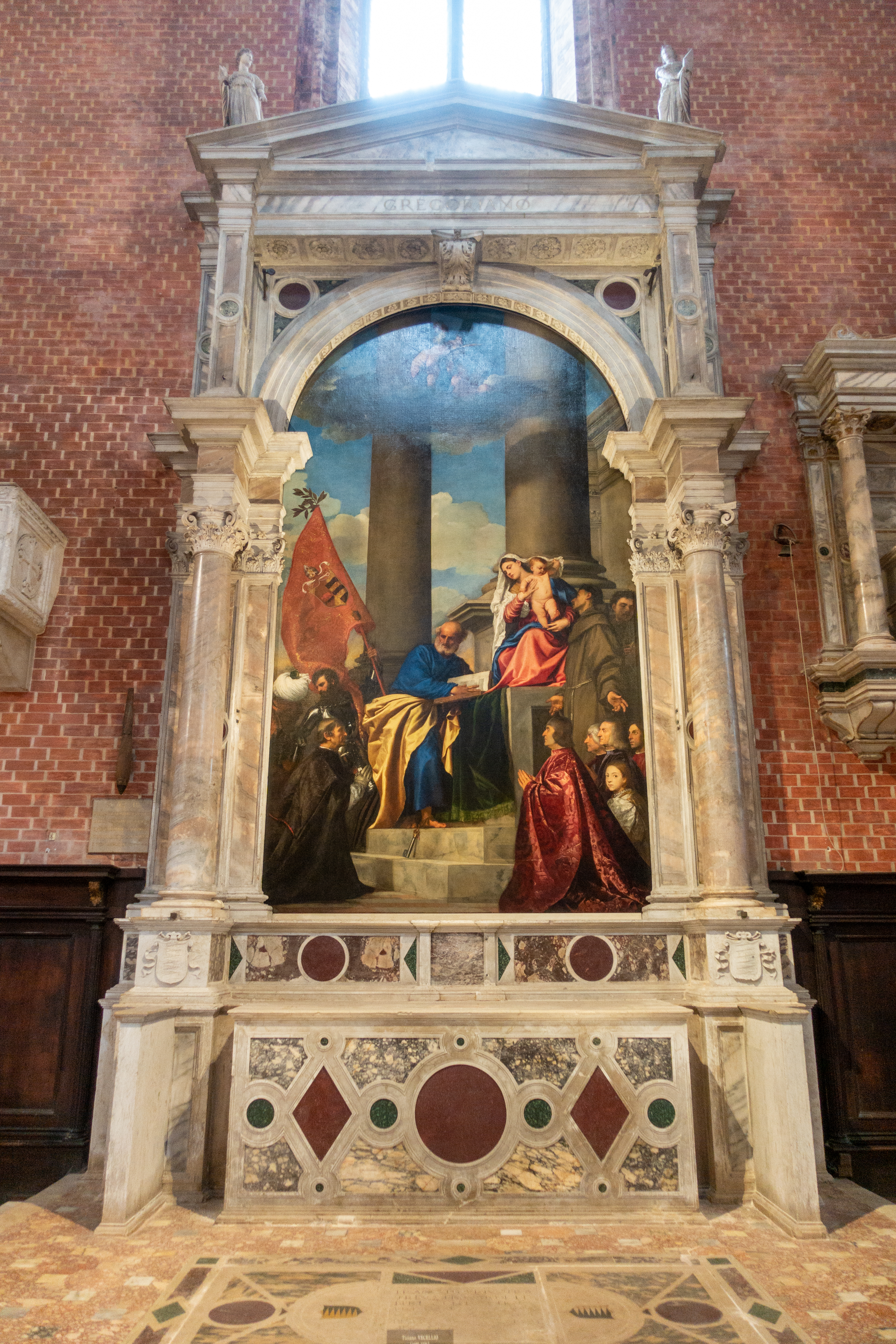
The restored altarpiece in its setting

Titian depicts his patron in a devotional stance, kneeling before the Virgin and presented to her by Saint Peter. Prominently displayed on the step is Saint Peter's key; its diagonal plane, leading toward the Virgin, parallels that of Jacopo. The Virgin's position at the top of the steps alludes to her celestial role as Madonna della Scala (Madonna of the Stairs) and as the Stairway to Heaven. Titian used his wife, who died in childbirth soon after, as the model for the Virgin Mary in this work.

The large red banner at the far left prominently displays the papal arms in the center and those of Jacopo below. Also displayed is a laurel branch, a symbol of victory. An unidentified knight has two prisoners in tow, a turbaned Turk and a Moor, probably a reference to Jacopo's victory over the Turks in 1502. At the right, Saint Francis of Assisi links the five kneeling Pesaro family members to Christ, suggesting that through his route of identification with Christ's salvation can be achieved. Just behind Saint Francis is Saint Anthony of Padua - both, like Saint Bernardino, are Franciscans, as is the church of Santa Maria Gloriosa dei Frari.

The members of the donor's family are motionless. All the other figures gesture energetically and occupy diagonal planes. The steps, surmounted by large columns cut off at the top, are thrust diagonally back into space. Infant angels appear on the cloud above. One seen in the rear view holds the Cross. The back of this angel is juxtaposed with the infant Christ, who turns playfully on Mary's lap and looks down at Saint Francis, who returns his gaze. The fabrics are characteristically rich and textured, particularly the flag and costumes. This attention to material textures is further enhanced by the variation of bright lights and dark accents in the sky. The light of Venice, sparkling in its waterways, seems to illuminate this painting.

== Composition ==
External videos
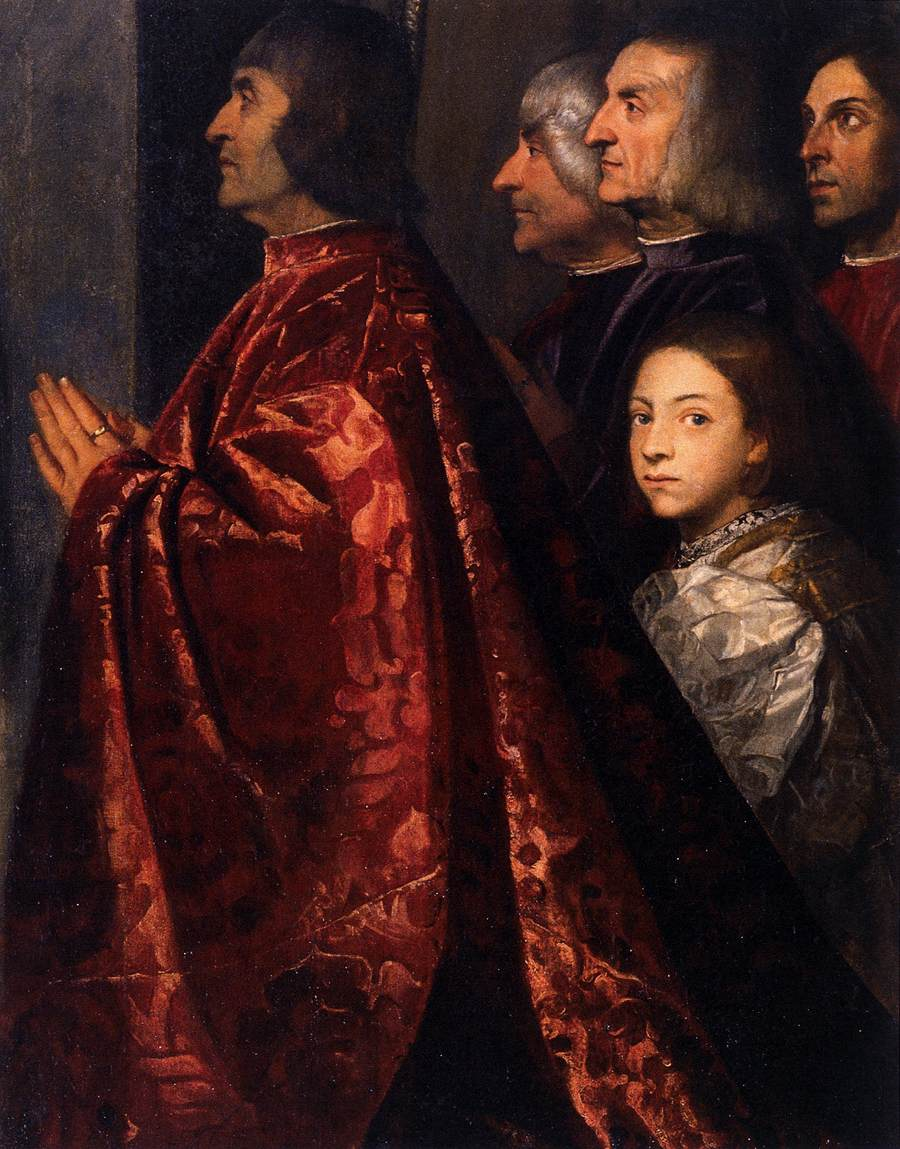
- Titian's Madonna of the Pesaro Family, Smarthistory

When Titian painted this altarpiece, he broke with a centuries-long tradition of placing the devotional figures (the Virgin and Child) in the center of the painting and the painted space. By doing this, he allowed for a greater sense of movement through the painting, presaging the Baroque period's more complicated compositional techniques. The painting is particularly innovative and shows an example of developed High-Renaissance style, as Titian has used diagonal and triangular principles to draw the viewer's eye up to the Madonna and Child, thus creating hierarchy within the work and showing that the Pesaro family are pious.

The architectural setting, involving the two large columns (which have been cropped to fit the altarpiece), draws emphasis vertically and to the height of the work, which draws the eye Heavenwards. These columns in the center of the painting are unprecedented in Renaissance painting and are the subject of some controversy. X-rays reveal that Titian painted several other architectural elements in their place before settling on the columns. Some critics have even speculated that Titian did not paint the columns. The outdoors setting suggests that the activity is taking place in a portico, in which the grandeur of the columns somehow belittles the human beings which leave the figures and the viewer almost in awe of the greater implied force.

== Removal and restoration ==
Following the May 2012 earthquakes in Northern Italy, Titian's painting was removed from view and began a lengthy conservation treatment funded by the non-profit organization Save Venice Inc. While the painting was being conserved, a replica photograph was displayed in the church. On September 21, 2017, more than 400 people attended a ceremony celebrating the re-installation of Titian's restored altarpiece.

== See also ==
- List of works by Titian
