= Everett Fahy =

American art historian

Everett Fahy (1941-2018) was an American art historian. He was director of The Frick Collection from 1973 until 1986, and then until 2009 the John Hennessy Chairman of European Paintings at the Metropolitan Museum of Art.

== Biography ==
Everett Fahy was born in Philadelphia, Pennsylvania in 1941. He received a B.A. from the University of Virginia, and a M.A. and Ph.D. from Harvard University.

He started working at the Metropolitan Museum of Art in 1970 as curator-in-charge of the European paintings department, and in 1973 moved to The Frick Collection where he became the director for 13 years. He then returned to the Metropolitan Museum of Art where he was the chairman of European paintings until his retirement in 2009.

Fahy was one of many scholars to serve on the board of Save Venice Inc., a non-profit organization dedicated to the conservation and preservation of Venetian cultural heritage. In 2011, William & Mary’s Muscarelle Museum of Art presented Fahy with The Cheek Medal, a national award for outstanding presentation of the arts.

In 2016 Christie's New York auctioned his personal collection of art as part of the Old Masters sales.
