= Santa Maria e San Donato =

Religious edifice in Murano, Italy

Coordinates: 45.45743°N 12.35720°E

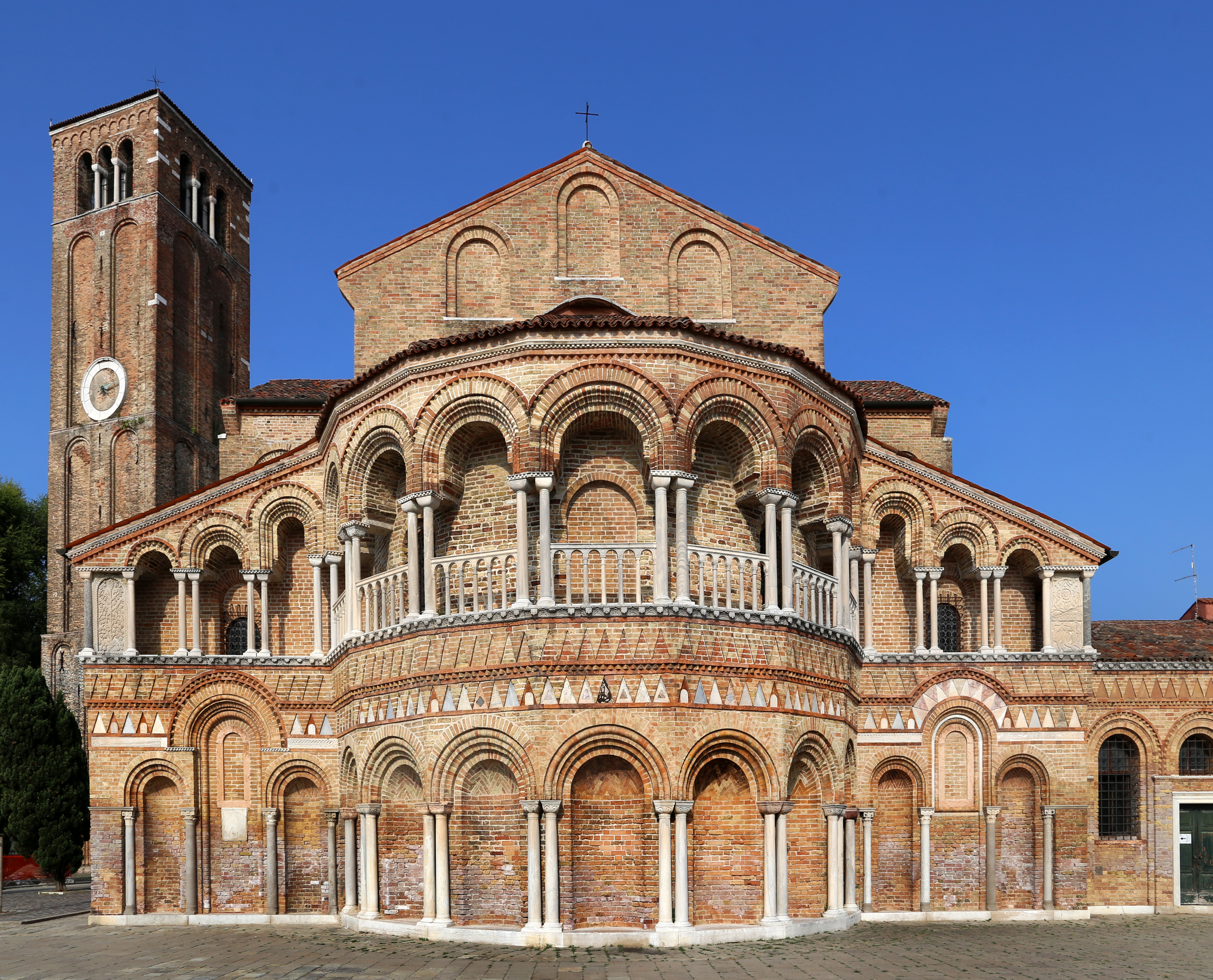
Church of Santa Maria e San Donato.

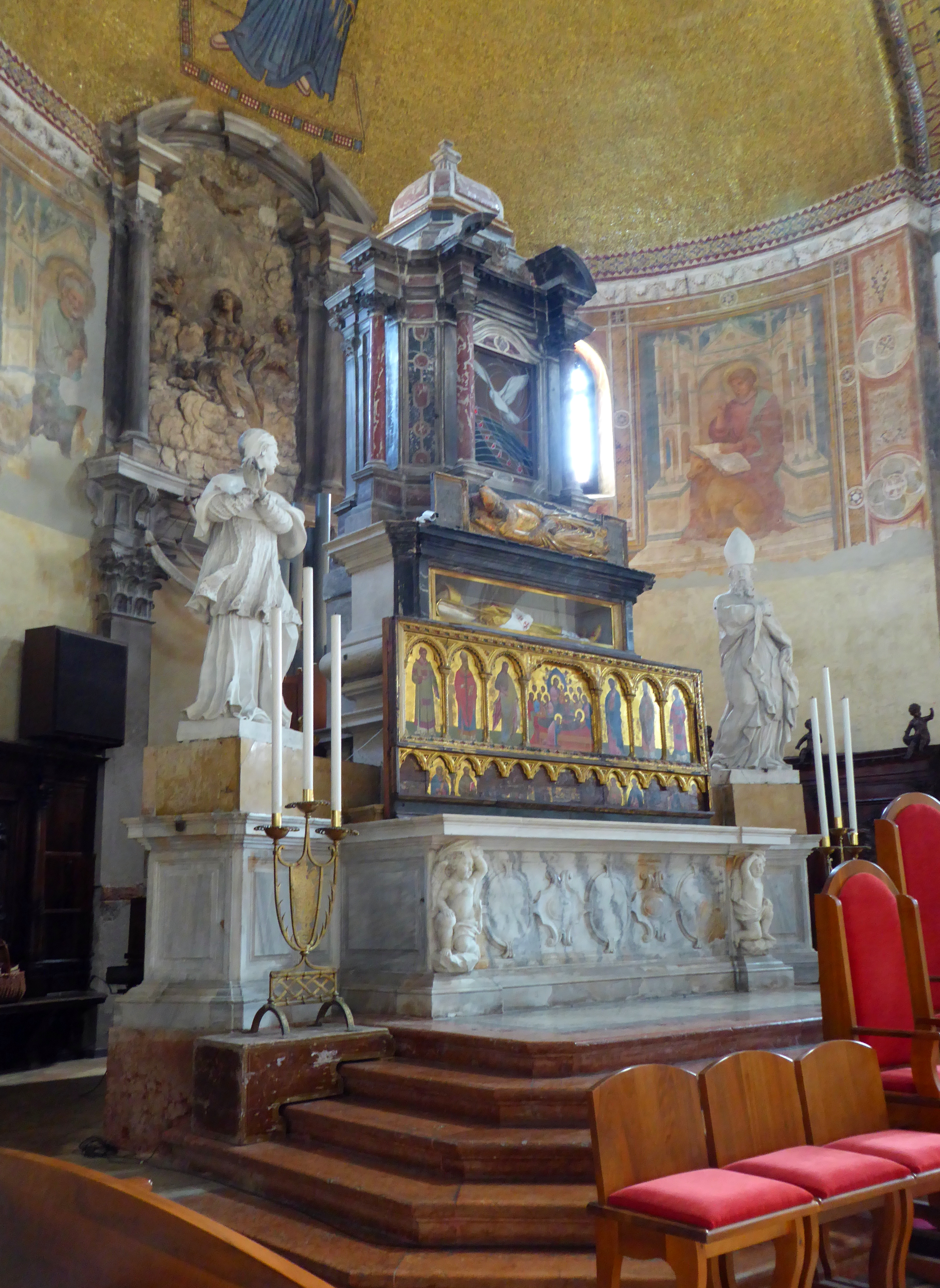
Altar in the church.

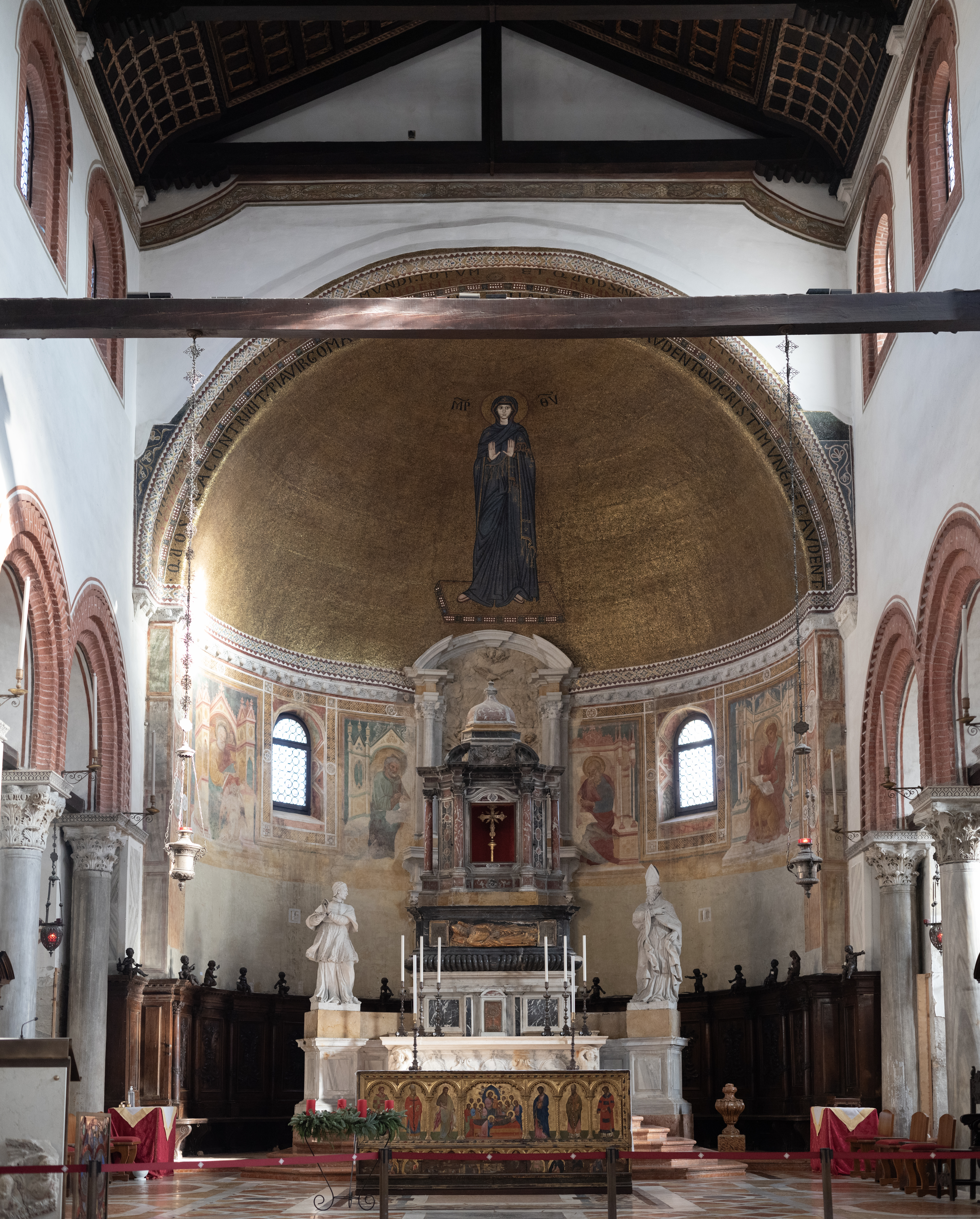
Interior

The Church of Santa Maria e San Donato is a religious edifice located in Murano, northern Italy. It is known for its twelfth century Byzantine mosaic pavement and is said to contain the relics of Saint Donatus of Euroea as well as large bones behind the altar said to be the bones of a dragon slain by the saint.

== History ==
The church is one of the oldest in the Venetian lagoon. It was originally built in the 7th century and is known to have been rebuilt in between 1125 and in 1040 AD, although it is possible that there have been more rebuildings in later times.

Development of the interiors of the church and valuable relics are related to the legendary quarreling between the parishes of this church and neighboring church of St. Stefano which lasted up to 1125, when Doge Domenico Michele established the dominance of Santa Maria church by storing the relics of St. Donatus of Euroea in it, which he had plundered from Cephalonia.

== Architecture ==
The church and its bell tower are built of dark red-brown brick, without plastering. The bell tower stands separately. The main entrance to the church faces west, but the most impressive facade is the colonnaded east side, which faces a canal.

The colourful stone mosaic floor of the church dates from around 1140. It measures over 500 square metres and is made of porphyry, serpentine, and other precious stones. The figural images include yoked cocks on who are carrying a fox", a peacock, an eagle and griffins. It also includes geometric patterns that represent Christian themes.

The floor has undergone a number of conservation treatments sponsored by the non-profit organization Save Venice Inc., beginning in the 1970s. Most recently, emergency funds were allocated to help repair missing tesserae and mortar supports after the church was flooded by high tides in November and December 2019, submerging the mosaic floor in corrosive seawater several times over the course of weeks.

The relics of San Donato are located in a marble sarcophagus. Behind the altar there are four rib bones, hanging from wires. The bones are more than 1 metre long. According to legend, these are bones of the dragon slain by St. Donatus in Greece. It is possible that these bones are from large extinct Pleistocene mammals.
