= Saint Vincent Ferrer Altarpiece =

Altarpiece by Giovanni Bellini

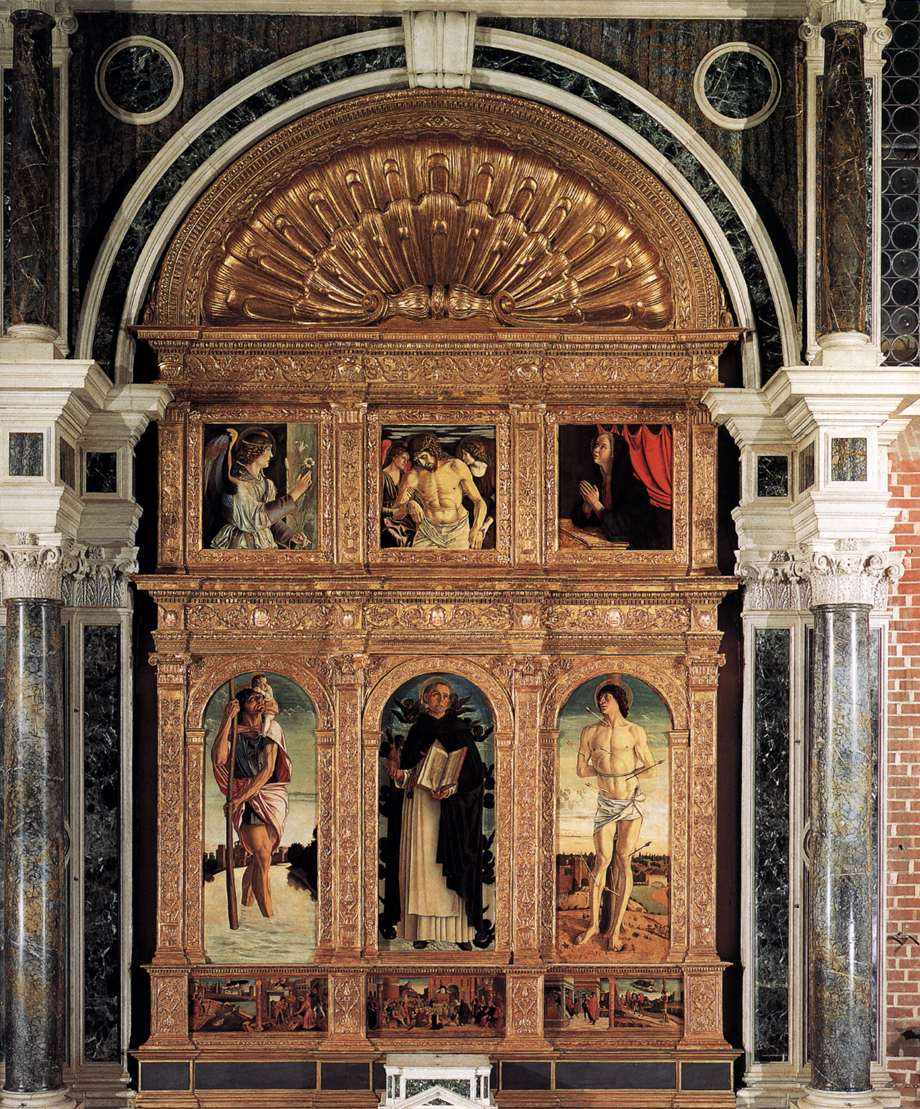
- Artist: Giovanni Bellini
- Year: 1464–1470
- Medium: tempera on panel
- Dimensions: 275 cm × 194 cm (108 in × 76 in)
- Location: Santi Giovanni e Paolo, Venice

The Saint Vincent Ferrer Altarpiece is a tempera-on-panel painting by Giovanni Bellini (possibly with some collaboration by another artist on the scenes of Ferrer's miracles on the predella, perhaps Lauro Padovano), dating to 1464–1470 and still in on the altar dedicated to Saint Vincent Ferrer at Santi Giovanni e Paolo, Venice, for which it was originally commissioned. Ferrer was a Spanish Dominican who had only been canonised in 1455 and his order was continuing to promote his cult.

The altar was finished in 1464 according to a receipt issued by one Olricus de Argentina to the then prior Giovanni da Merano regarding the fabrica Sancti Vincentii. The altarpiece was mentioned as a work of Bellini in 1581 by Francesco Sansovino and some argue that he may have produced its many canvases in stages, given their stylistic differences. From left to right the central register shows Saint Christopher, Saint Vincent Ferrer and Saint Sebastian. The upper register shows a Pietà flanked by an Annunciation scene, with the archangel Gabriel to the left and the Virgin Mary to the right. Above the Pietà there was originally a lunette showing God the Father, to which Mary directed her gaze; this was recorded in 1664 by Boschini but later lost.

In 1994, the altarpiece underwent conservation funded by the non-profit organization Save Venice Inc.

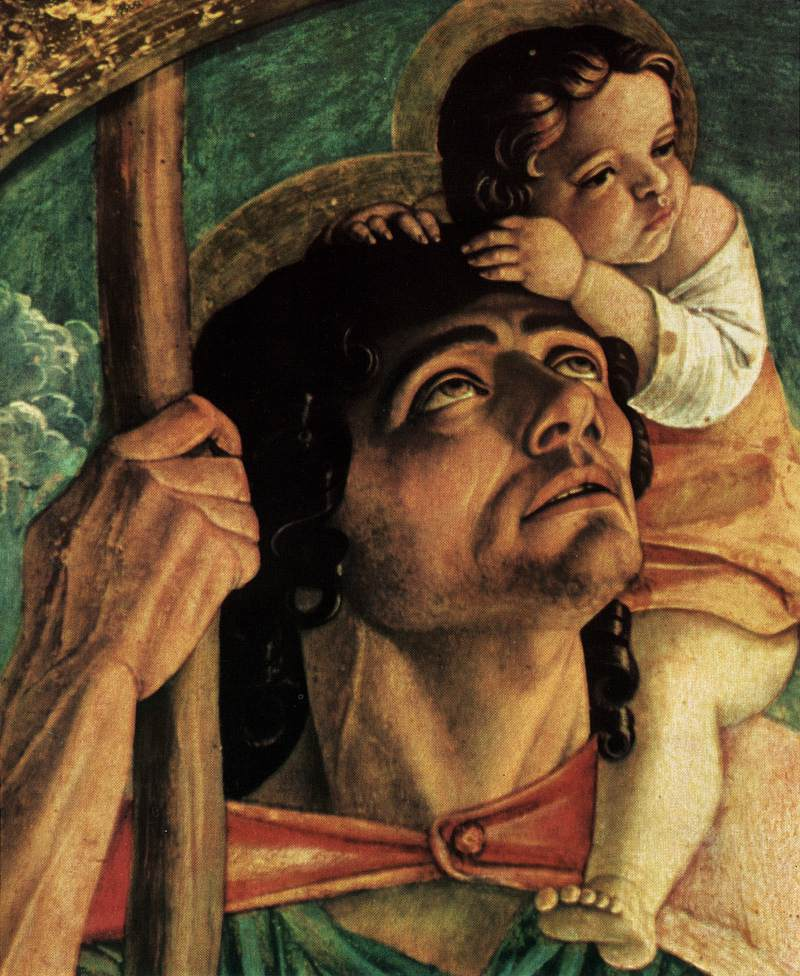
Saint Christopher and the Christ Child

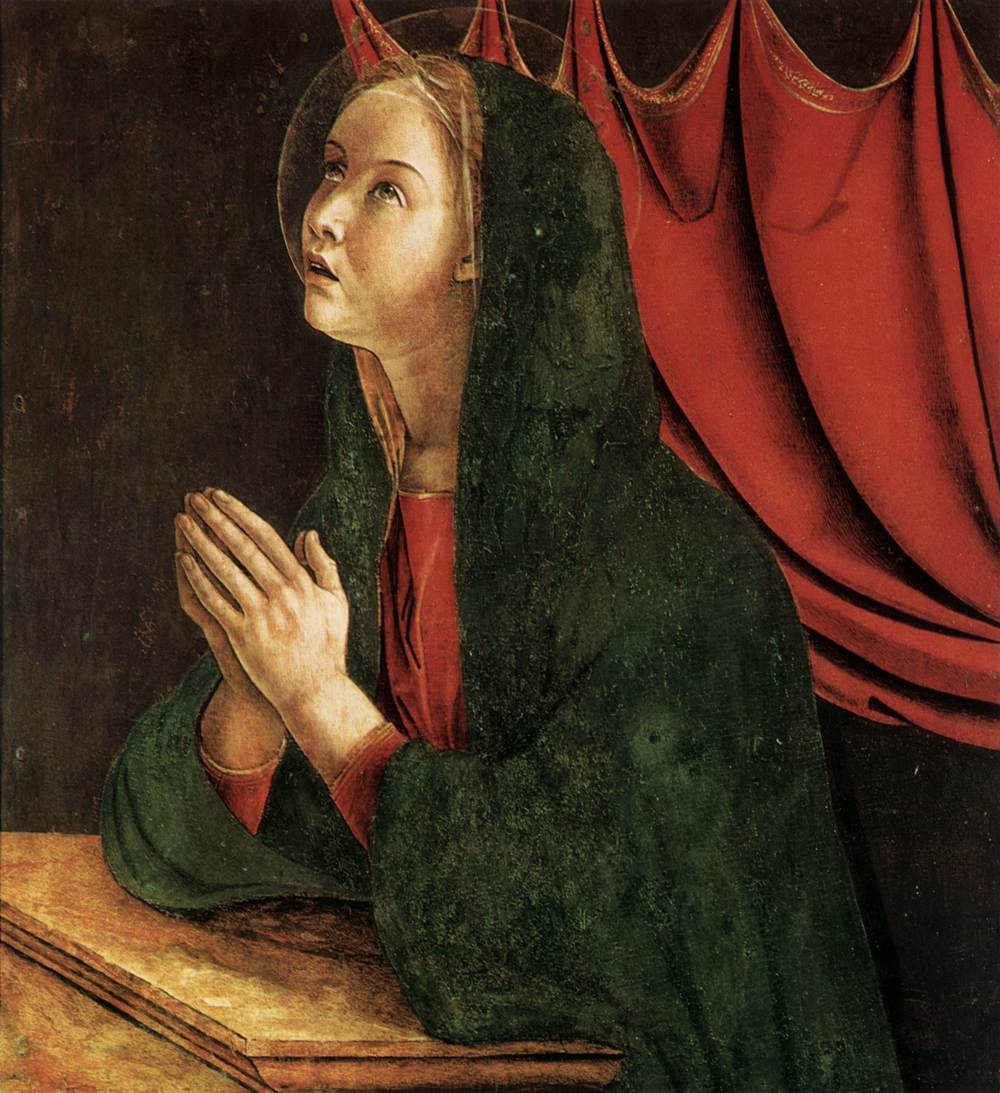
Annunciation

== Bibliography ==
- Olivari, Mariolina (2007), "Giovanni Bellini", Pittori del Rinascimento, by AA.VV., Florence: Scala, ISBN 978-8881170999
