= Crucifixion (Tintoretto) =

1565 painting by Jacopo Tintoretto

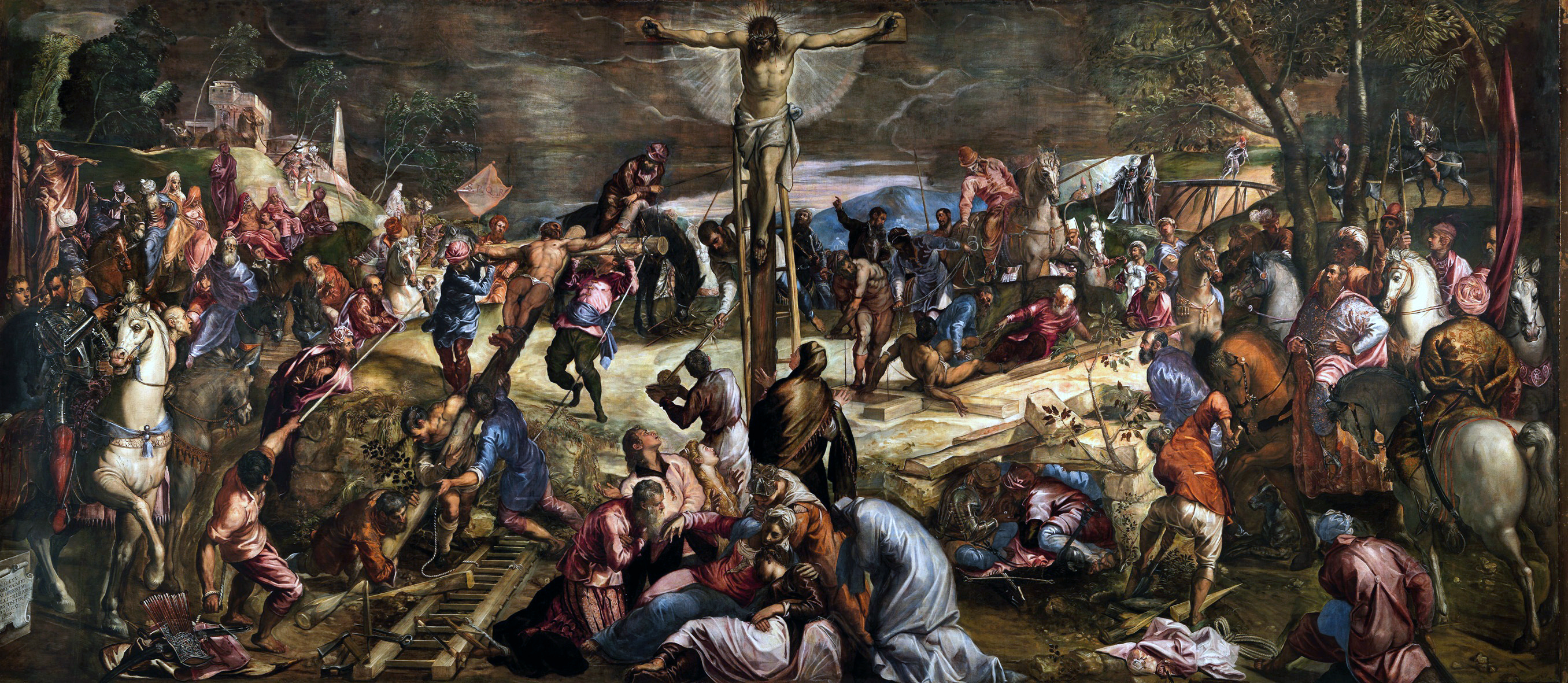
- Artist: Tintoretto
- Year: 1565
- Medium: oil on canvas
- Dimensions: 536 cm × 1127 cm (211 in × 444 in)
- Location: Scuola Grande di San Rocco, Venice

The Crucifixion by Tintoretto is a large painting in oil on canvas, installed in the Sala dell'Albergo of the Scuola Grande di San Rocco, Venice. It is signed and dated 1565. This painting is one of the most dramatic versions of the Crucifixion in the history of Christian art.

Tintoretto painted other images of the Crucifixion as well, including one that is in the Church of San Cassiano in Venice (1568), one that is in Church of the Gesuati in Venice (c. 1565)., and one that is in the Gallerie dell'Accademia in Venice and was formerly in the Church of San Severo in Venice. Colm Tóibín wrote about visiting all four of these paintings.
