= Sydney Joseph Freedberg =

American art historian

Sydney Joseph Freedberg (November 11, 1914 – May 6, 1997) was an American art historian and curator, mainly of Italian Renaissance painting.

Freedberg was born in Boston and attended the Boston Latin School. He graduated from Harvard College in 1939, and acquired a doctoral degree a year later. One of his mentors was Bernard Berenson. He taught Fine Arts at Harvard from 1954 to 1983. At the time of his retirement in 1983 he was the Arthur Kingsley Porter Professor of Fine Arts at Harvard. He became chief curator from 1983 to 1988 of the National Gallery of Art in Washington, DC upon retiring from Harvard.

During the Second World War, Freedberg risked disciplinary action by refusing as a matter of conscience to work on intelligence about Rome. Later he would say that "I was worried that the information I might gather might be used in a military operation against that city", and thus lead to irreparable damage to works of art there. Despite his decision, he was made an Honorary Member of the Order of the British Empire (Military Division) for his contributions to the war effort.

In November 1966, after disastrous floods in Italy, Freedberg served as national vice chairman (1966–74) of the committee to Rescue Italian Art. In 1970, Freedberg began service on the board of directors of Save Venice, of which he was a founding member.

For these many contributions to the preservation and greater understanding of Italian art and culture, Freedberg was made a Grand Officer in the Order of the Star of Solidarity (Italy) in 1968 and a Grand Officer of the Order of Merit of the Italian Republic in 1982. He was also awarded honors in 1986 by the Socio del Ateneo Veneto and the Academia Clementina Bologna. A year later he began service on the Advisory Council to the Vatican Museums for the Sistine Chapel Restoration (serving as president from 1990 to 1993). In 1995, he was awarded the International Galileo Galilei Prize. In 1988, he was awarded the National Medal of Arts.

== Selected books ==
- Freedberg, Sydney J. (1950). Parmigianino: his works in painting. Cambridge, MA: Harvard University Press.
- —— (1961). Painting of the High Renaissance in Rome and Florence. Cambridge University Press/Harper & Rowe. ISBN 978-0-06-430013-1.
- —— (1963). Andrea del Sarto. Cambridge, MA: Harvard University Press.
- —— (1993) [1971]. Painting in Italy, 1500–1600 (3rd ed.). New Haven, CT: Penguin/Yale University Press. ISBN 0-300-05587-0.
- —— (1995). Polish nationalist thought in exile, 1831–1848. Cambridge, MA: Harvard University Press.
