= 1514 in art =

Events from the year 1514 in art.

== Events ==
- Raphael's friend, courtier Giovanbattista Branconio dell'Aquila, becomes the personal keeper of Hanno, the white elephant brought to Rome in 1514.

== Works ==
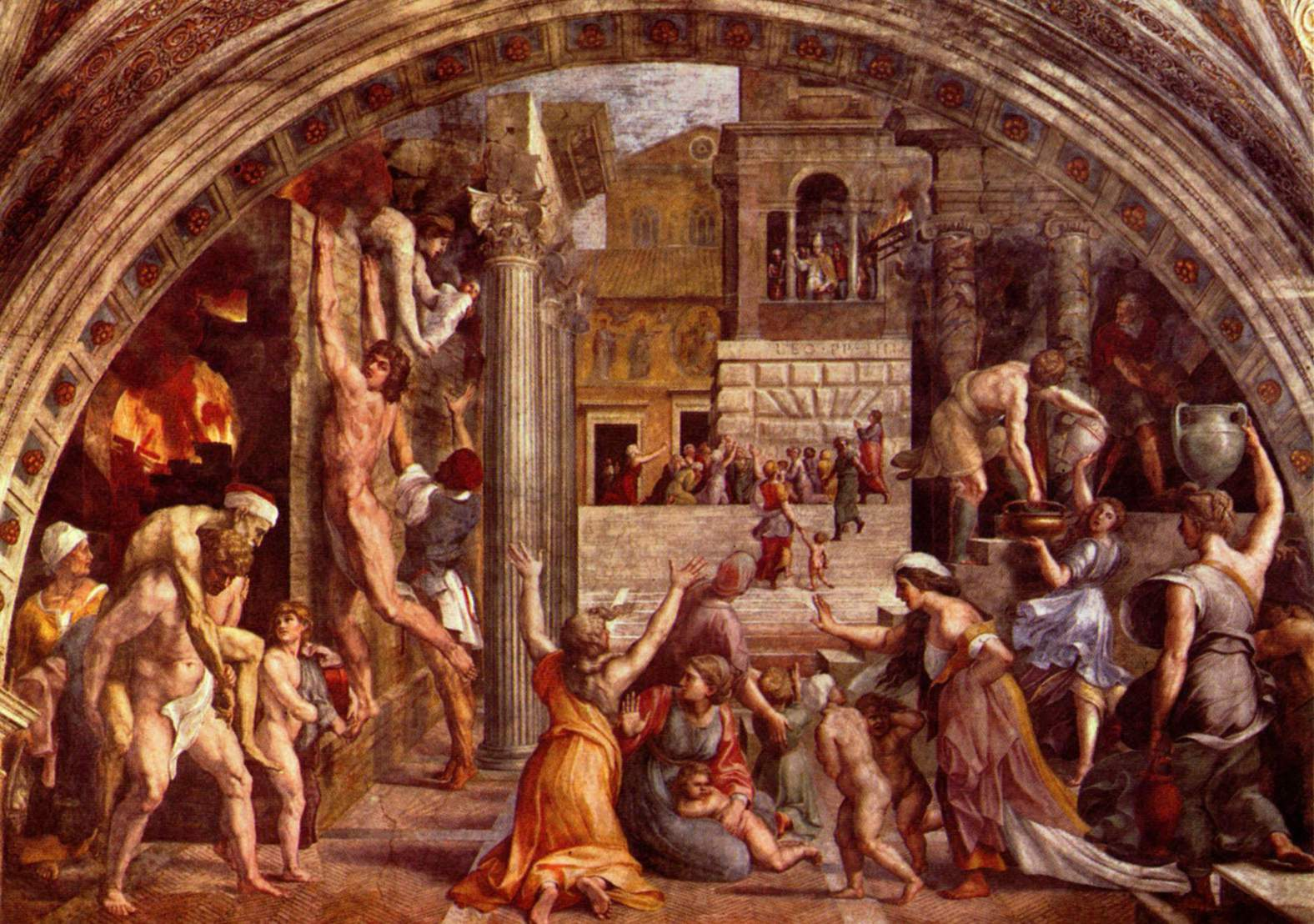
Raphael, The Fire in the Borgo

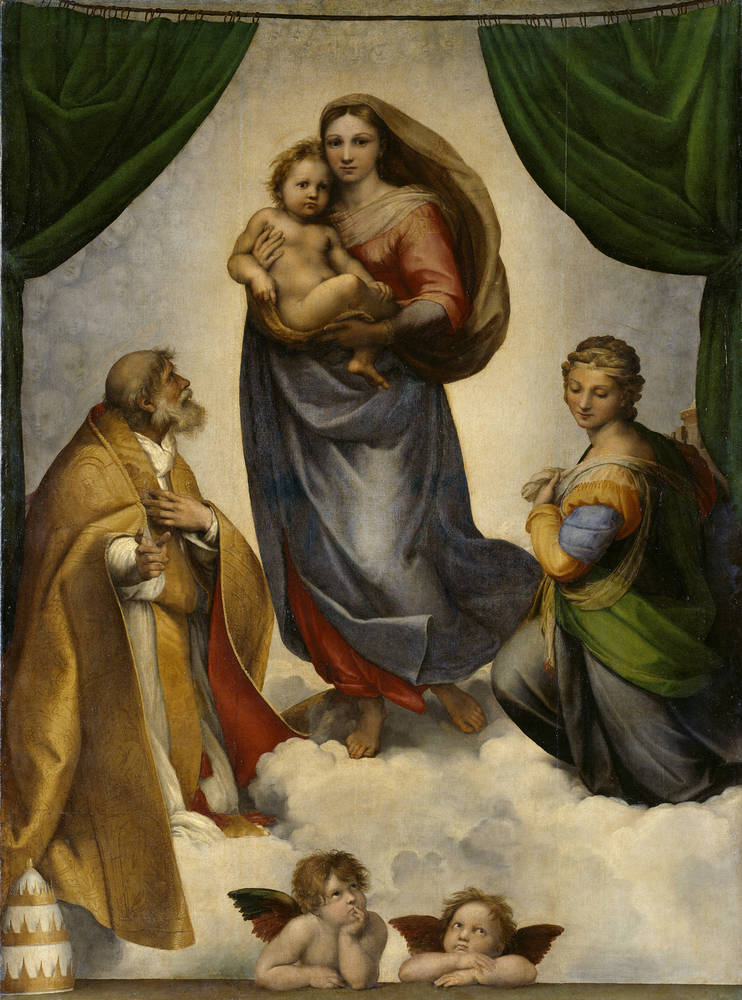
Raphael, Sistine Madonna

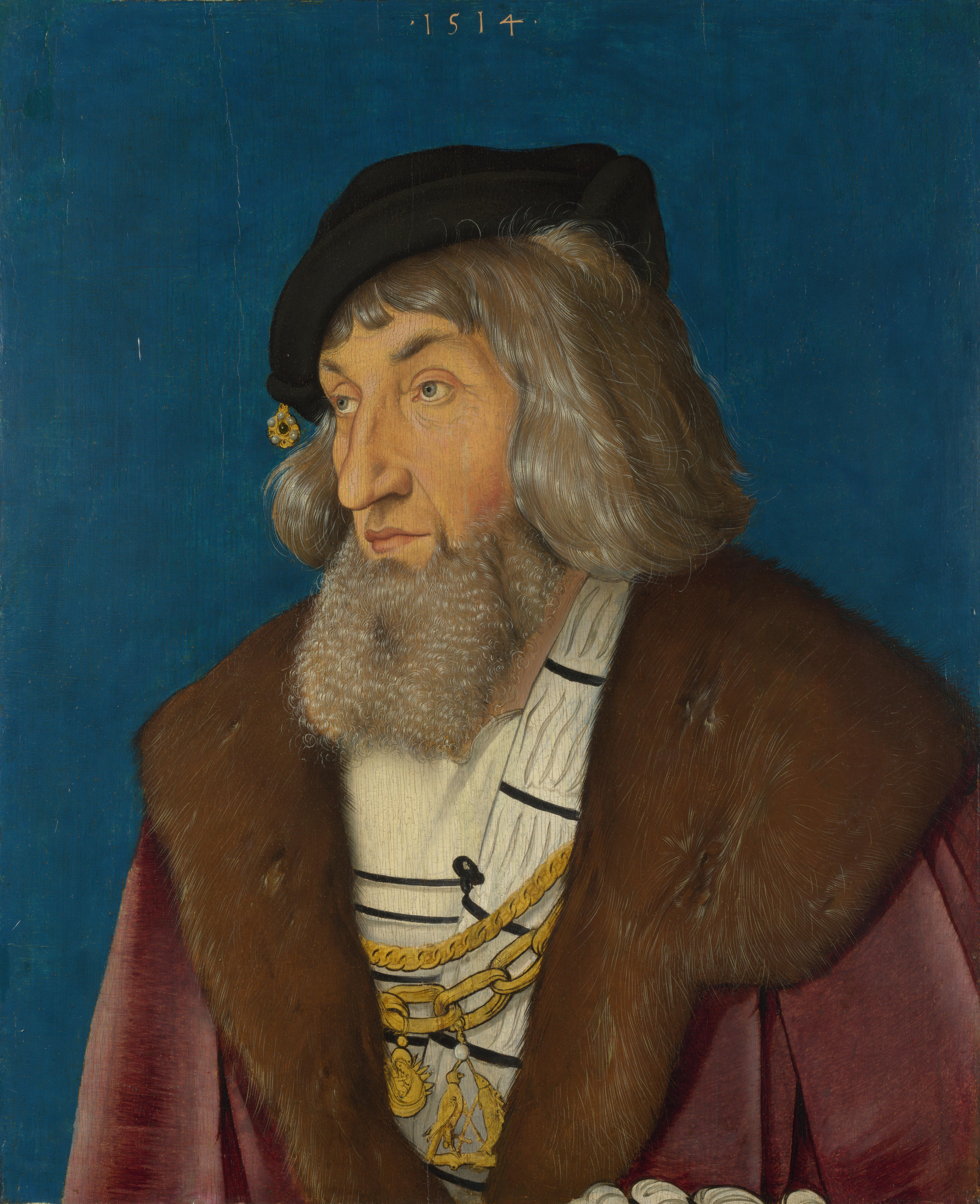
Baldung, Portrait of a Man

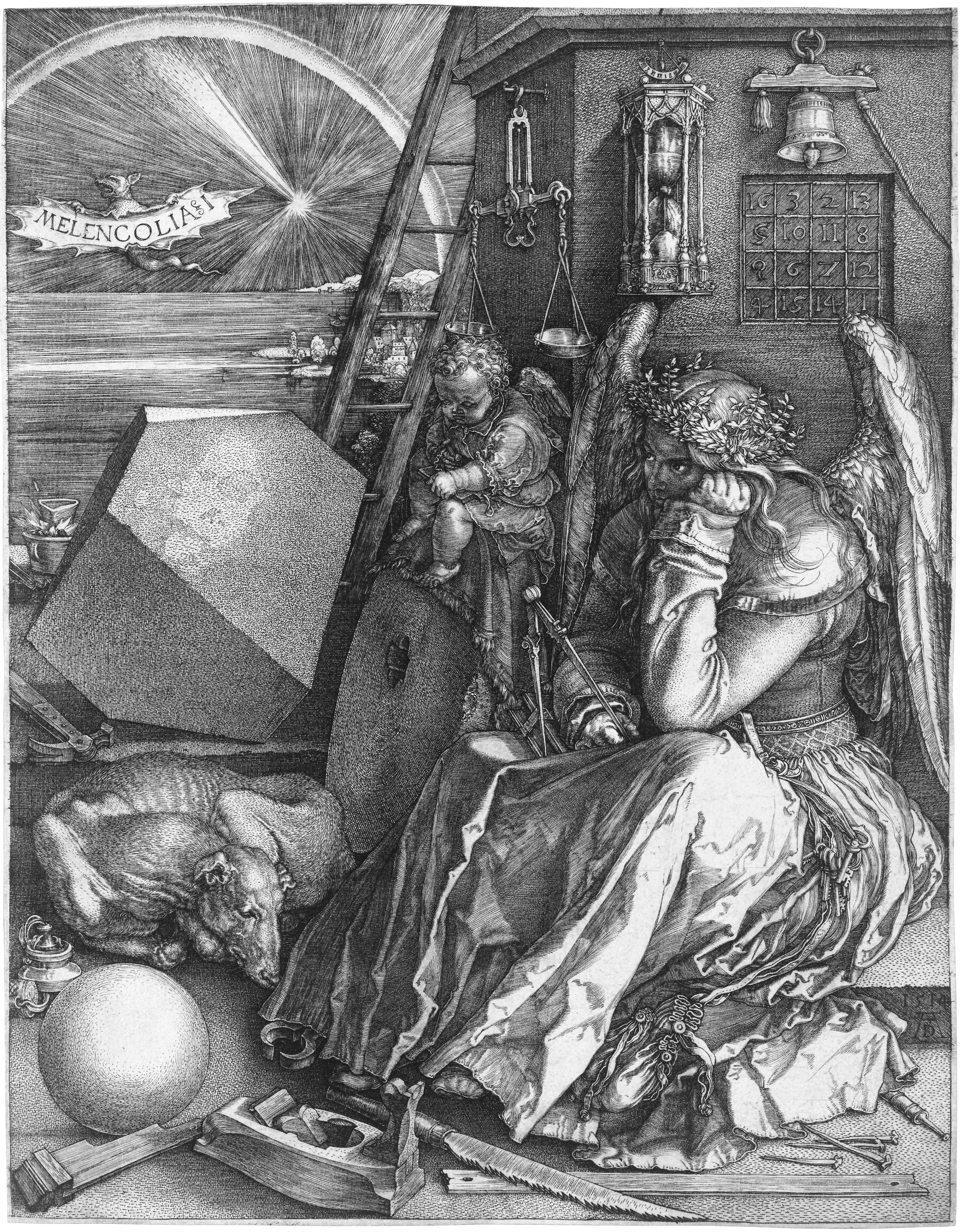
Dürer, Melancholia I

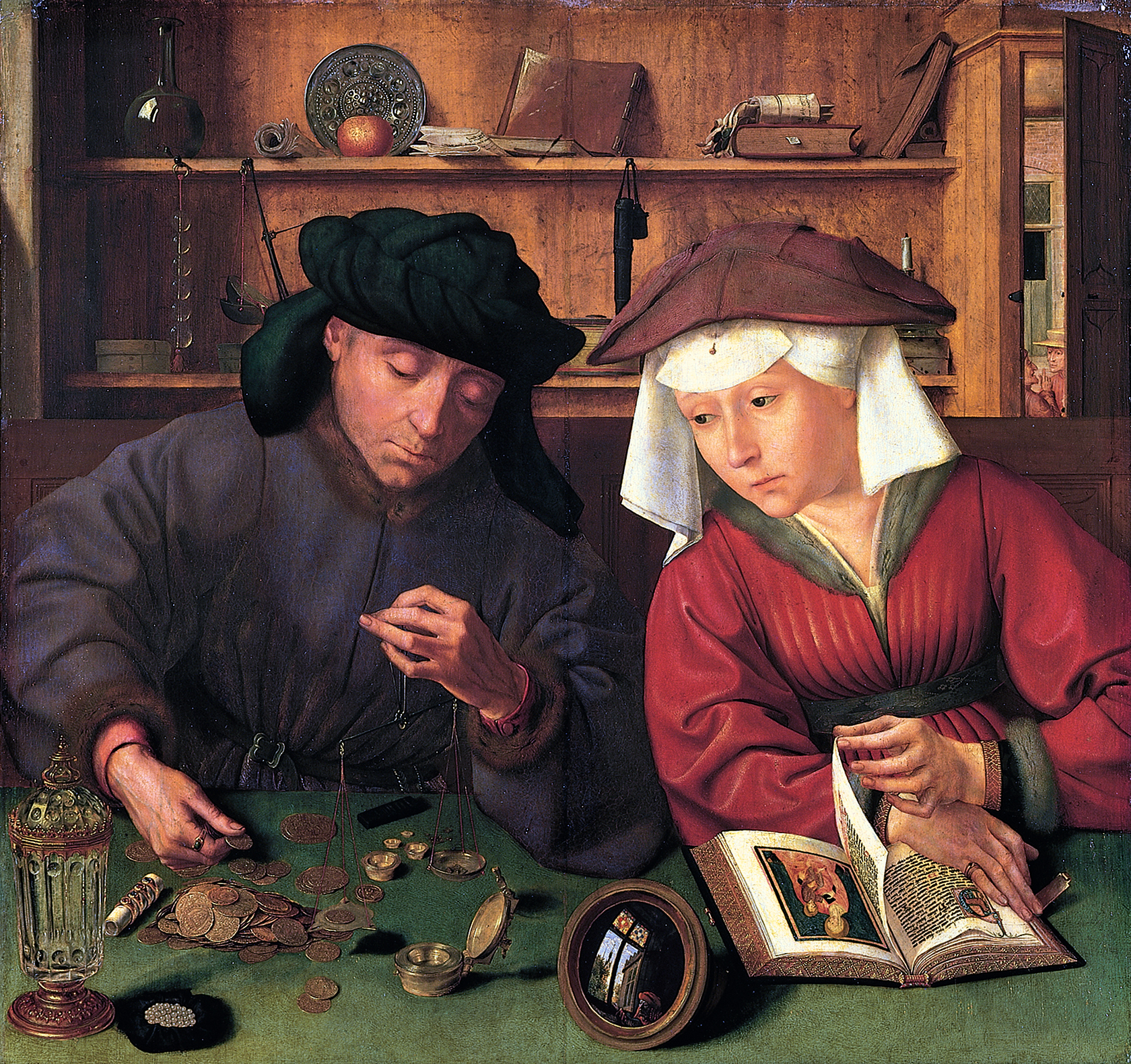
Matsys, The Moneylender and his Wife
- Hans Baldung – Portrait of a Man
- Giovanni Bellini – The Feast of the Gods (in original form)
- Vittore Carpaccio
  - St. Vitale on horseback and other saints
  - The Sermon of St. Stephen
- Lucas Cranach the Elder
  - The Judgement of Paris (1512-14)
  - Madonna with Child with Young John the Baptist
  - Portraits of Henry IV of Saxony and Catherine of Mecklenburg
- Albrecht Dürer – Engravings
  - Melancholia I
  - Saint Jerome in His Study
- Quentin Matsys – The Moneylender and his Wife
- Raphael – some dates approximate
  - Madonna dell'Impannata
  - Madonna della seggiola
  - Madonna della tenda
  - Portrait of a Young Man
  - Sibyls (fresco in Santa Maria della Pace, Rome)
  - Sistine Madonna
  - (with Giulio Romano) – (Frescos in Raphael Rooms of the Apostolic Palace in the Vatican)
    - Liberation of Saint Peter
    - The Fire in the Borgo
    - The Mass at Bolsena
    - The Meeting of Leo the Great and Attila
- Titian – approximate dates
  - Balbi Holy Conversation
  - Sacred and Profane Love

== Births ==
- Cornelis Floris de Vriendt, Flemish Renaissance architect and sculptor (died 1575)
- Virgil Solis, German draughtsman and printmaker in engraving, etching and woodcut (died 1562)

== Deaths ==
- date unknown
  - Andrea di Niccolò - Italian painter of the Sienese School (born 1440)
  - Georg Glockendon, woodblock cutter, printer and painter (date of birth unknown)
- probable
  - Giovanni Dalmata, Dalmatian sculptor (born 1440)
  - Francisco de Osona, Spanish Renaissance painter (born 1465)
