= Lazzaro Bastiani =

Italian painter (1429–1512)

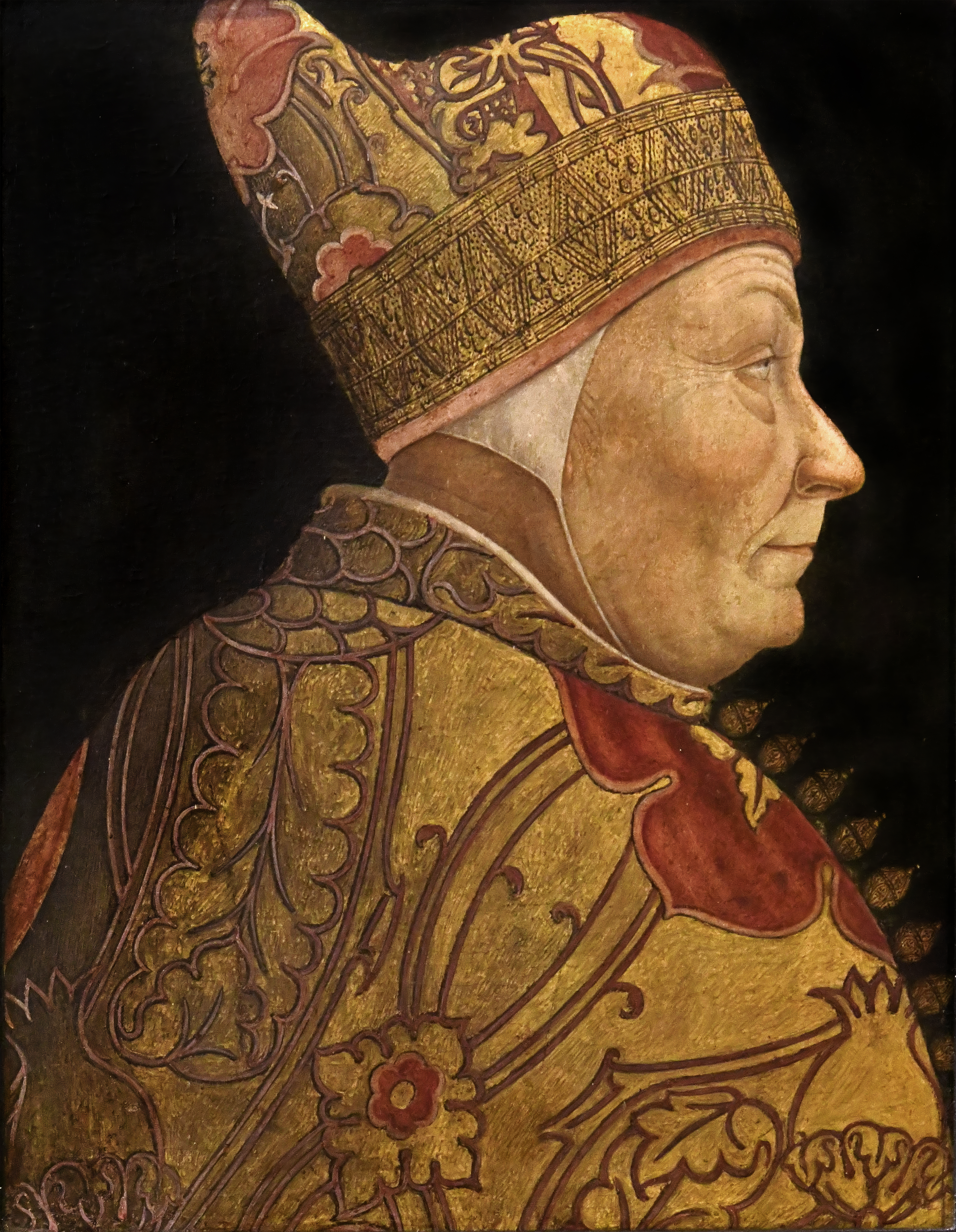
Lazzaro Bastiani, Portrait of the Venetian doge Francesco Foscari, Museo Civico Correr, Venice, 1457–1460

Lazzaro Bastiani (1429 – 5 April 1512) was an Italian painter of the Renaissance, active mainly in Venice. His students included Vittore Carpaccio and Benedetto Rusconi.

== Career ==
He was born in Padua. He is first recorded as a painter in Venice by 1460 in a payment for an altarpiece of San Samuele, for the Procuratori di San Marco. In 1462 he was paid at the same rate as Giovanni Bellini. In 1470, he was a member of the Scuola di San Girolamo in Venice. In the 1480s he worked with Gentile Bellini for the Scuola Grande di San Marco. He painted a Coronation of the Virgin (Gallerie dell'Accademia); a Nativity (1477); and a St. Anthony on the Nut Tree.

In 1508, he was called upon, with his pupil Vittore Carpaccio, to estimate paintings of Giorgione for the Fondaco dei Tedeschi.

== Selected works ==
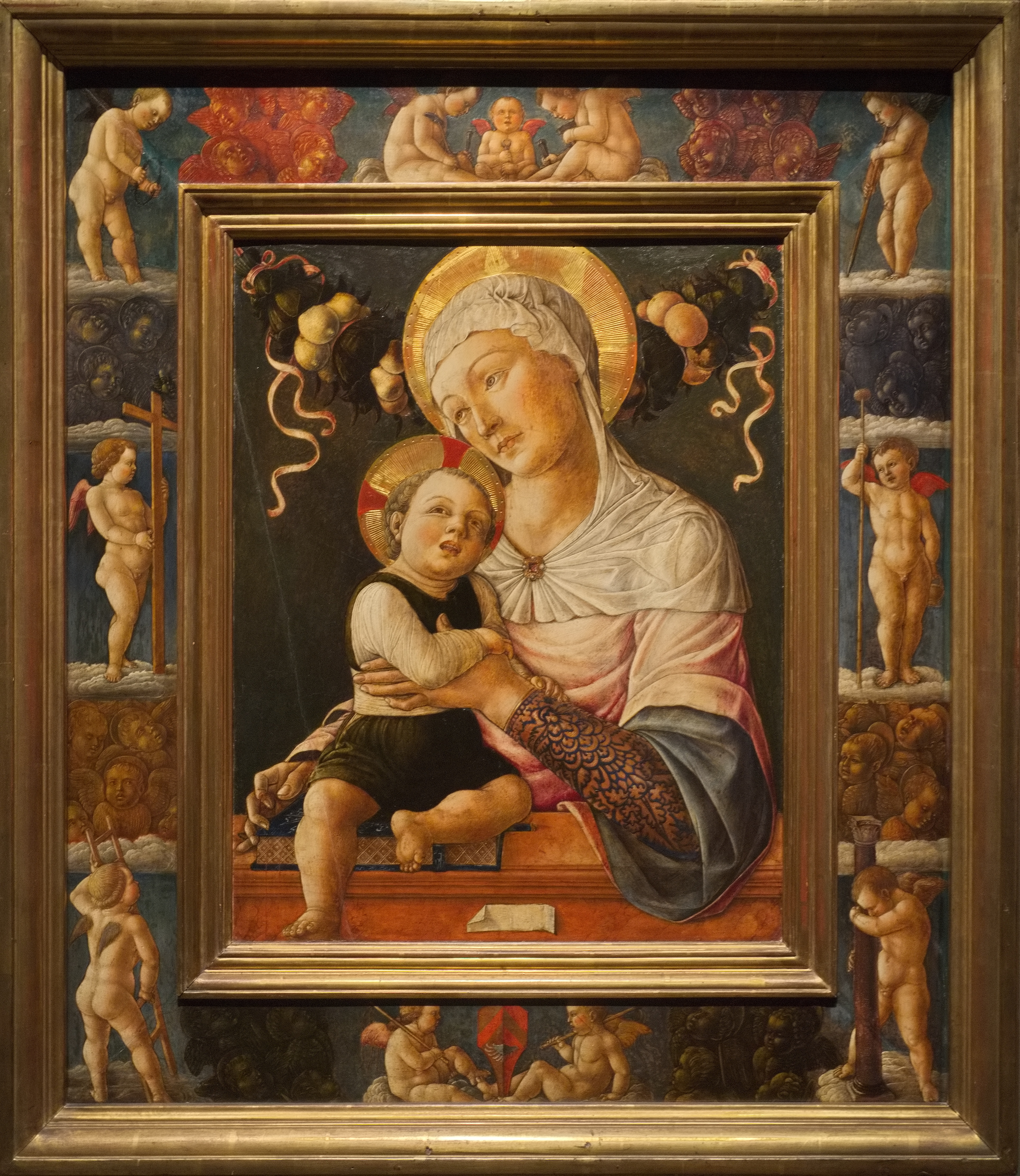
Maria mit dem Kind in einem bemalten Rahmen mit zwölf Spiritelli, ca. 1465, Gemäldegalerie, Berlin

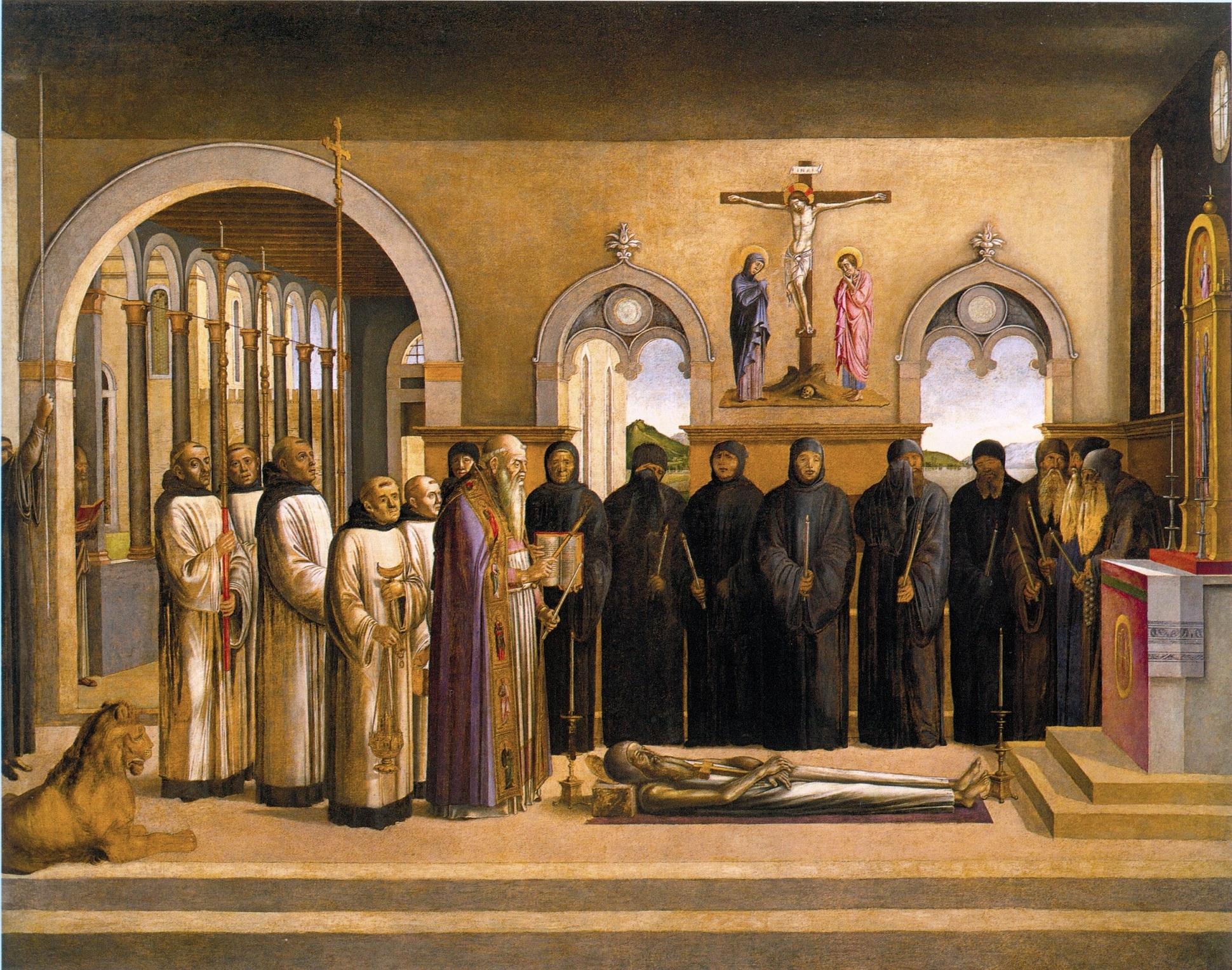
Beerdigung des Saint Jerome, 1470–1472, Accademia, Venice

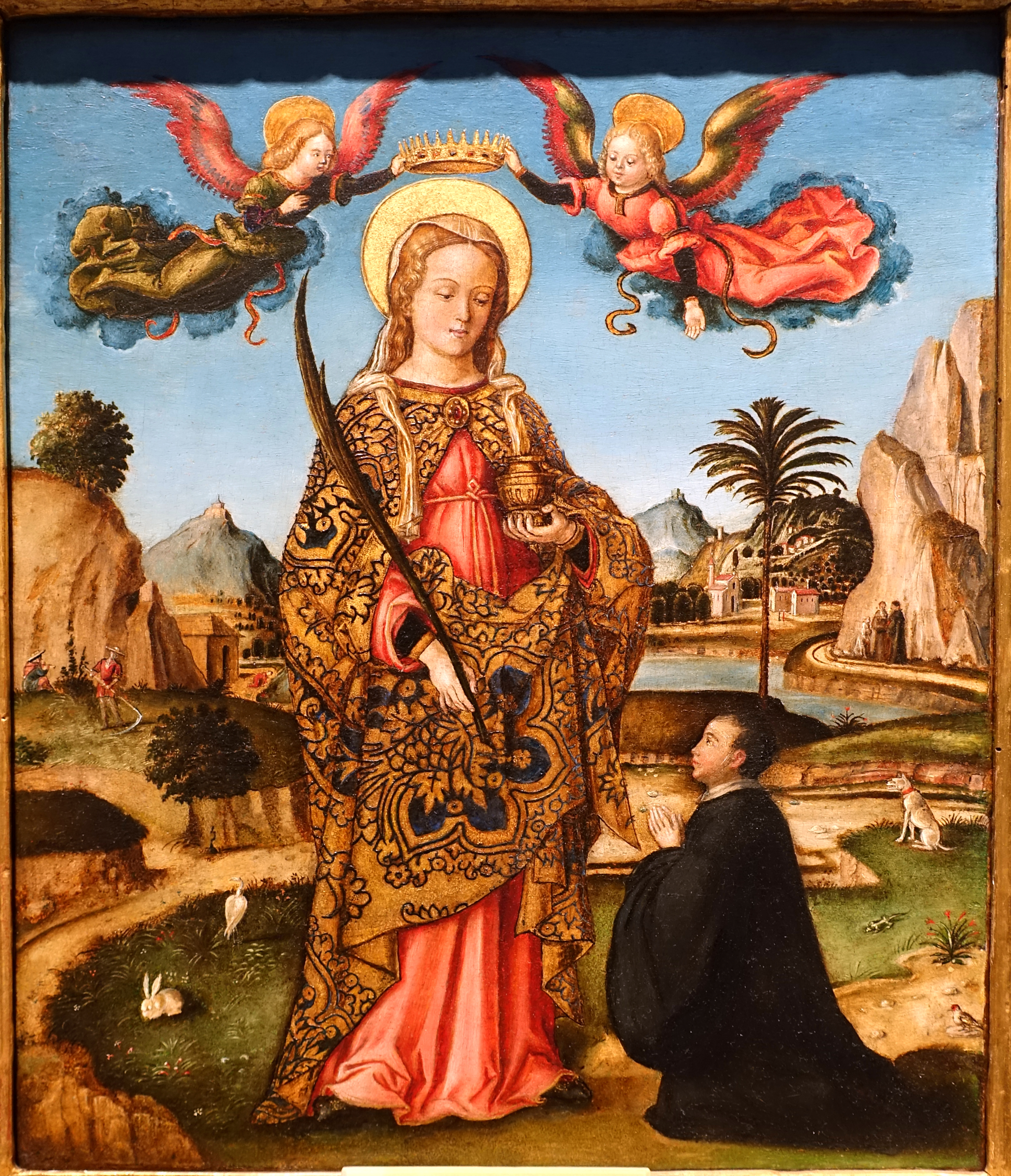
St. Lucia, 1480–1490, Portland Art Museum, Oregon, USA

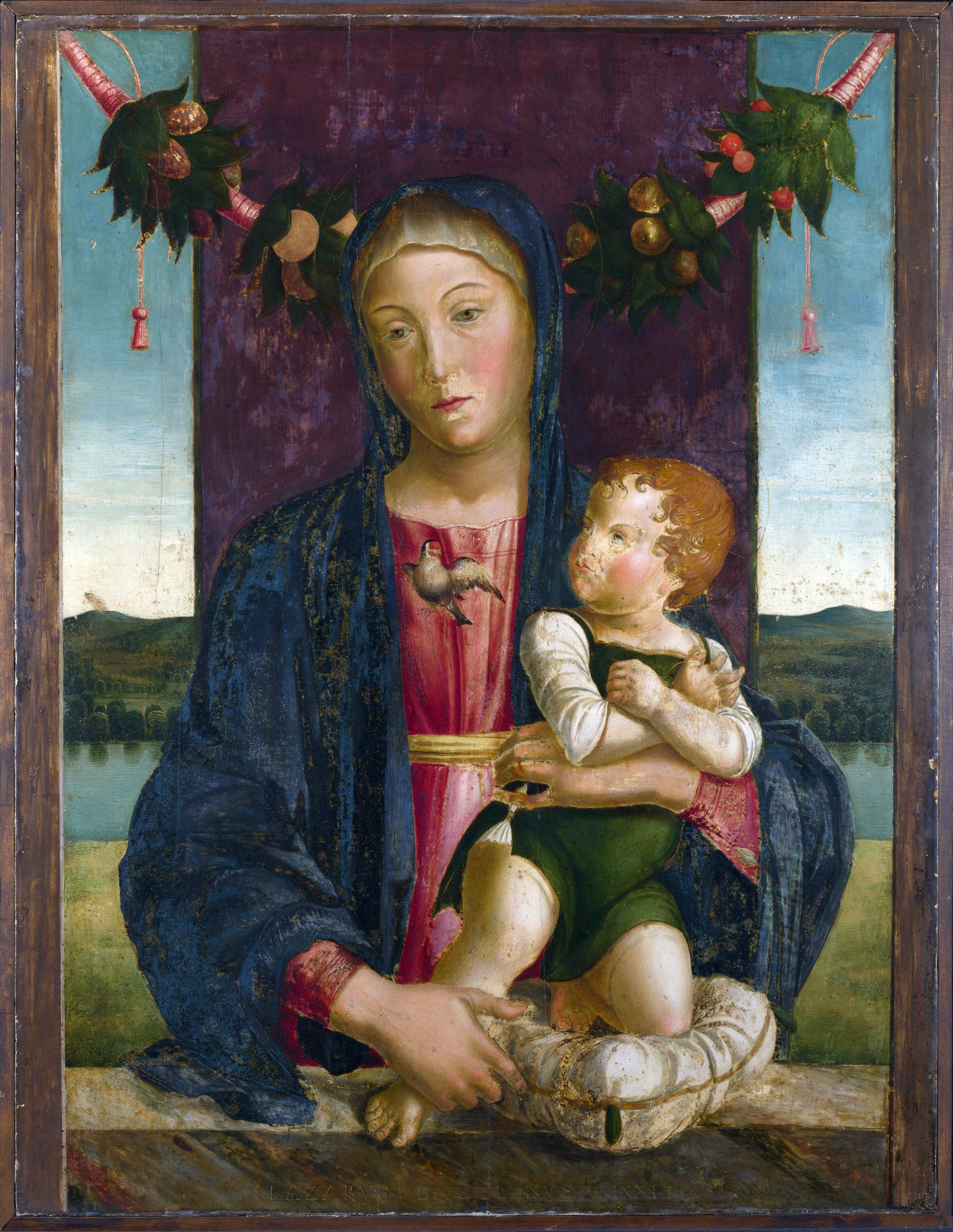
Madonna and Child, ca. 1480–1490, National Gallery, London

== Sources ==
- di Giampaolo, Mario (2003). "Bastiani, Lazzaro". Grove Art Online.
- Getty museum biography
- A Guide to the Paintings of Venice, Karl Karoly, and Frank Tryon Charles, George bell and Sons, London, 1895, page 229.
- Bryan, Michael (1886). Robert Edmund Graves (ed.). Dictionary of Painters and Engravers, Biographical and Critical. Vol. I: A-K. London: George Bell and Sons. p. 92.
