= The Sermon of St. Stephen (Carpaccio) =

Italian oil-on-canvas painting (1514)

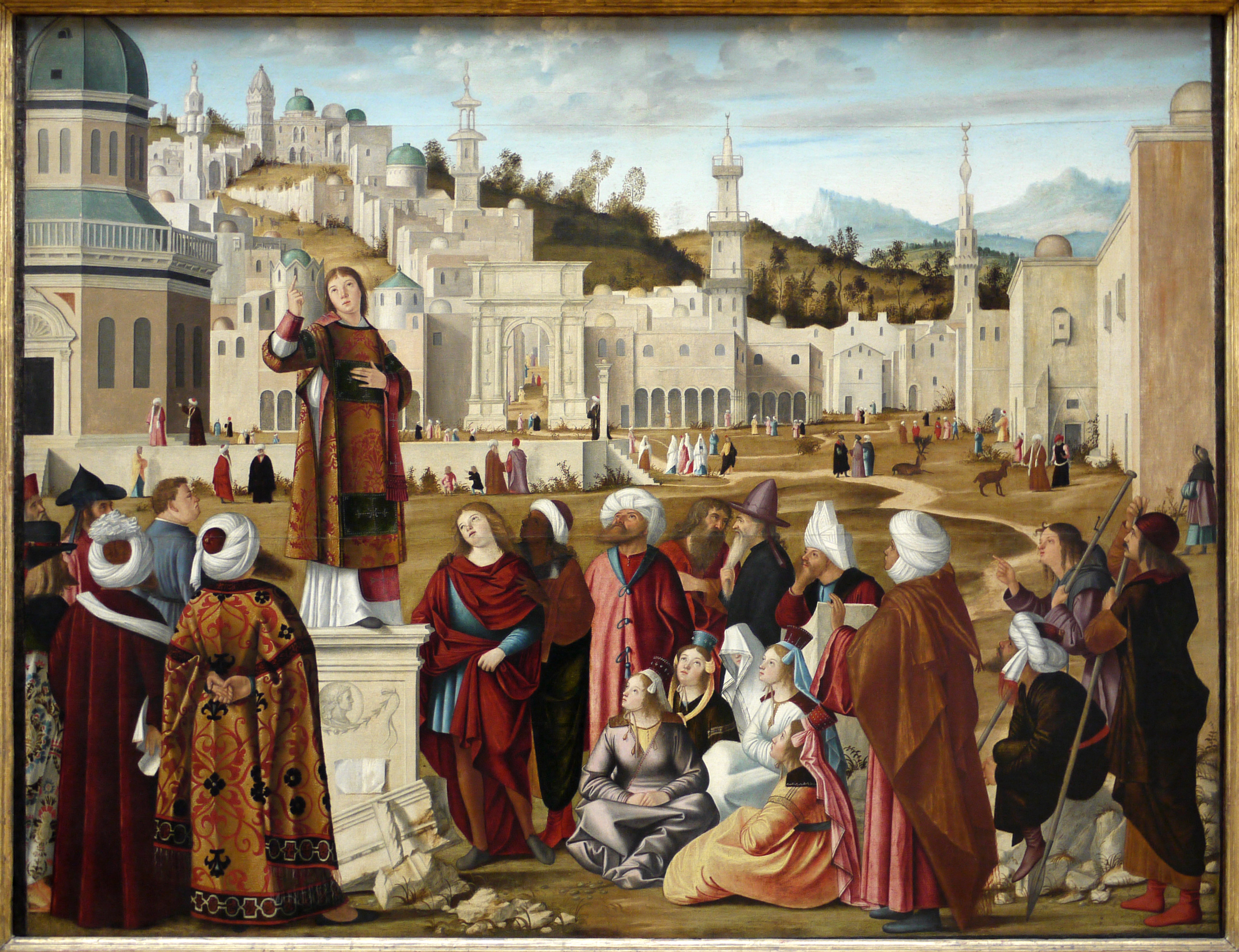
- Artist: Vittore Carpaccio
- Year: 1514
- Medium: Oil on canvas
- Dimensions: 148 cm × 194 cm (58 in × 76 in)
- Location: Louvre, Paris

The Sermon of Saint Stephen is an oil-on-canvas painting by Italian artist Vittore Carpaccio, done in 1514. The painting is from the Venetian Renaissance and depicts the first Christian martyr, St. Stephen, giving a sermon. It is now in the Louvre in Paris.

== History ==
This painting was one of five scenes representing the life of Saint Stephen, painted between 1511 and 1514 for the Scuola dei Lanieri, Santo Stefano (Venice). The series was broken up in 1806, when the religious houses were suppressed. Two panels went to the Brera Gallery, Milan; in 1812, Vivant Denon exchanged some of the northern paintings in the Louvre for Italian works in the Brera, and one of these panels was transferred under this arrangement. Another is in Berlin; one has disappeared, and the fifth is in Stuttgart.

The Sermon of Saint Stephen the deacon, represented in this Louvre painting, took place in Jerusalem. This gave Carpaccio an excuse for filling his canvas with picturesque oriental costumes and architecture. Jerusalem in the early days of Christianity is here identified as Constantinople (actually Yoros Castle on the opposite side of the Bosphorus ) – an imaginative Constantinople full of Turkish, antique, Byzantine and Italian elements. Carpaccio refers with pride, in a letter to the Marquis of Mantua, to a view of Jerusalem which he had painted.

== See also ==
- Venetian school (art)
- Jerusalem

== Sources ==
- Patricia Fortini Brown, Venetian Narrative Painting in the Age of Carpaccio (New Haven and London: Yale University Press, 1988/1994)
- Augusto Gentili, Le storie di Carpaccio. Venezia, i turchi, gli ebrei, Marsilio, (2006) (in Italian)
- Peter Humfrey, Carpaccio, Chaucer Press (2005)
- Stefania Mason & Andrew Ellis, Carpaccio: The Major Pictorial Cycles: The Narrative Paintings, Skira (2000)
- Chisholm, Hugh, ed. (1911). "Carpaccio, Vittorio" . Encyclopædia Britannica. Vol. 5 (11th ed.). Cambridge University Press. p. 382.
- Del Puppo, Alessandro. "Vittore Carpaccio. The Invention of a Painter in XIXth-Century Europe." session ‘The Long Shadow of the Venetian Cinquecento’at the Annual Meeting of the Renaissance Society of America, Washington, DC. 2012.
- Daniele Trucco, "Vittore Carpaccio e l'esasperazione dell'orrido nell'iconografia del Rinascimento", n «Letteratura & Arte», n. 12, 2014, pp. 9–23
- Humfrey, Peter, ed., Vittore Carpaccio: Master Storyteller of Renaissance Venice. Washington, D.C.: National Gallery of Art, 2022. ISBN 9780300254471
