= Vittore Carpaccio =

Italian painter (1460s – c. 1525)

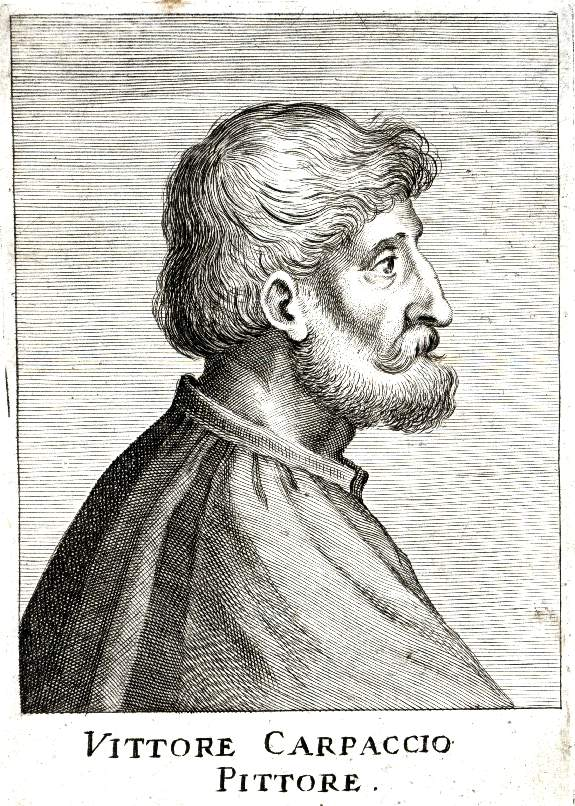
- Portrait by unknown artist, c. 1700
- Born: Between 1460 and 1465; Venice, Venetian Republic (present day Italy)
- Died: 1525 or 1526 (aged 60−66); Capo d'Istria, Venetian Republic (present day Slovenia)
- Other names: Vetor Scarpanzo; Vittore Carpatio; Vittore Carpathius
- Education: Bellini studio
- Known for: Painting; architecture
- Notable work: Two Venetian Ladies (1490); The Dream of St. Ursula (1495); Miracle of the Relic of the Cross at the Ponte di Rialto (c. 1496); Saint Augustine in His Study (1502); Young Knight in a Landscape (1510)
- Movement: Early Renaissance; High Renaissance; Venetian school

Vittore Carpaccio (UK: /kɑːrˈpætʃ(i)oʊ/ kar-PATCH-ee-oh, US: /-ˈpɑːtʃ-/ -PAHTCH-, Italian: [vitˈtoːre karˈpattʃo]; c. 1460/65 – c. 1525) was an Italian painter of the Venetian school who studied under Gentile Bellini. Carpaccio was largely influenced by the style of the early Italian Renaissance painter Antonello da Messina (c. 1430–1479), as well as Early Netherlandish painting. Although often compared to his mentor Gentile Bellini, Vittore Carpaccio's command of perspective, precise attention to architectural detail, themes of death, and use of bold color differentiated him from other Italian Renaissance artists. Many of his works display the religious themes and cross-cultural elements of art at the time; his portrayal of Saint Augustine in His Study from 1502, reflects the popularity of collecting "exotic" and highly desired objects from different cultures.

Carpaccio's works ranged from single pieces painted on canvas to altarpieces and large pictorial cycles. Several of the altarpieces, including St. Thomas Aquinas Enthroned (1507), Presentation of Christ in the Temple (1510), and Martyrdom of the Ten Thousand (1515), were commissioned by churches in Venice, while the pieces following the year 1510 were primarily commissioned by individual patrons in Venice. One of his largest pictorial series, The Legend of Saint Ursula, was begun in 1490.

He is perhaps known best for his large urban scenes, such as the Miracle of the Relic of the Cross at the Ponte di Rialto. This work offers some of the best impressions of Venice at the height of its power and wealth, illustrating the strong sense of civic pride among its citizens. In other paintings he demonstrates a sense of fantasy that seems to look back to medieval romance, rather than sharing in the pastoral vision of the next generation.

By about 1510 Carpaccio's style was perceived by contemporaries as too conservative, showing little influence from the Humanist trends that transformed Italian Renaissance painting during his lifetime. Scholarship in English dedicated to his biography and works remains meager when compared with the scholarship about his Venetian contemporaries, such as Giovanni Bellini or Giorgione.

== Early life and works ==
Carpaccio was born in Venice (between 1460 and 1465), the son of Pietro Scarpaza, a Venetian furrier in the parish of Arcangelo Raffaele. (Note: The occupation of Carpaccio's father has remained debated, spanning from a leather merchant to a fisherman and boat builder. However, scholars have alternatively identified involvement in furriery. According to Peter Humfrey, the emeritus professor of art history at the University of St. Andrews, "Vittore was the son of Pietro Scarpazza, a Venetian furrier.") Although Carpaccio's precise date of birth remains unknown, various documents have offered clues in order to narrow it down to a particular span of years. In a will from 1472, his uncle Fra Ilario listed him as an inheritor. According to Venetian customs, this would have indicated that he was at least 15 at this time, suggesting a birth year before 1457. However, a closer examination of Venetian law by scholars led to the discovery that children could be regarded as future heirs, thus Carpaccio's birth year range was raised to c. 1460 to 1465. Another document revealed that Carpaccio continued to live with his father through 1486, signifying late adolescence by this time and confirming this later range of birth years. Peter Humfrey presents the various bits of evidence that scholars have used in order to determine Carpaccio's birth years, as well as the dates of his earliest works, and in turn in which workshop he trained in Venice. Ultimately, the most recent research argues for a birth date between 1460 and 1465; he died around 1525 or 1526.

Carpaccio (or Scarpaza, Scarpazza or Scarpanza or Scarpanzo, as the name was variously recorded in the Venetian dialect) came from a family originally from Mazzorbo, an island in the diocese of Torcello. Archival documents trace the family back to at least the thirteenth century, and its members were diffused and established throughout Venice. Carpaccio signed two early works with the Venetian form of his last name: first as VETOR[E] SCHARPAÇO in his Virgin and Child (c. 1488) at the Museo Correr (Fondazione Musei Civici di Venezia) and then as VETOR SCARPAZO on the parapet in his Salvator Mundi with Four Saints (c. 1490) owned by the Fondazione Luciano Sorlini in Carzago di Calvagese (in Brescia). By 1490, with the painting Arrival in Cologne (part of the Life of Saint Ursula cycle; see below), he began to use variants of the Latin Carpatius and Carpathius. It was not until a 1648 publication that one of his biographers, Carlo Ridolifu, referred to the artist as "Carpaccio" the name for which he is known today.

Early twentieth-century scholars Molmento and Ludwig argued that Carpaccio's first teacher Lazzaro Bastiani, who, like the Bellini brothers and Vivarini, was the head of a large atelier in Venice. In the end, scarce details remain about his early life, leaving scholars to piece together his early artistic training and formation. In the 2022 catalogue raisonné, Humfrey presents the different arguments for why Carpaccio possibly apprenticed in the Venetian studio of the Bellini family, developing his artistry under the guidance of Gentile Bellini and/or Giovanni Bellini.

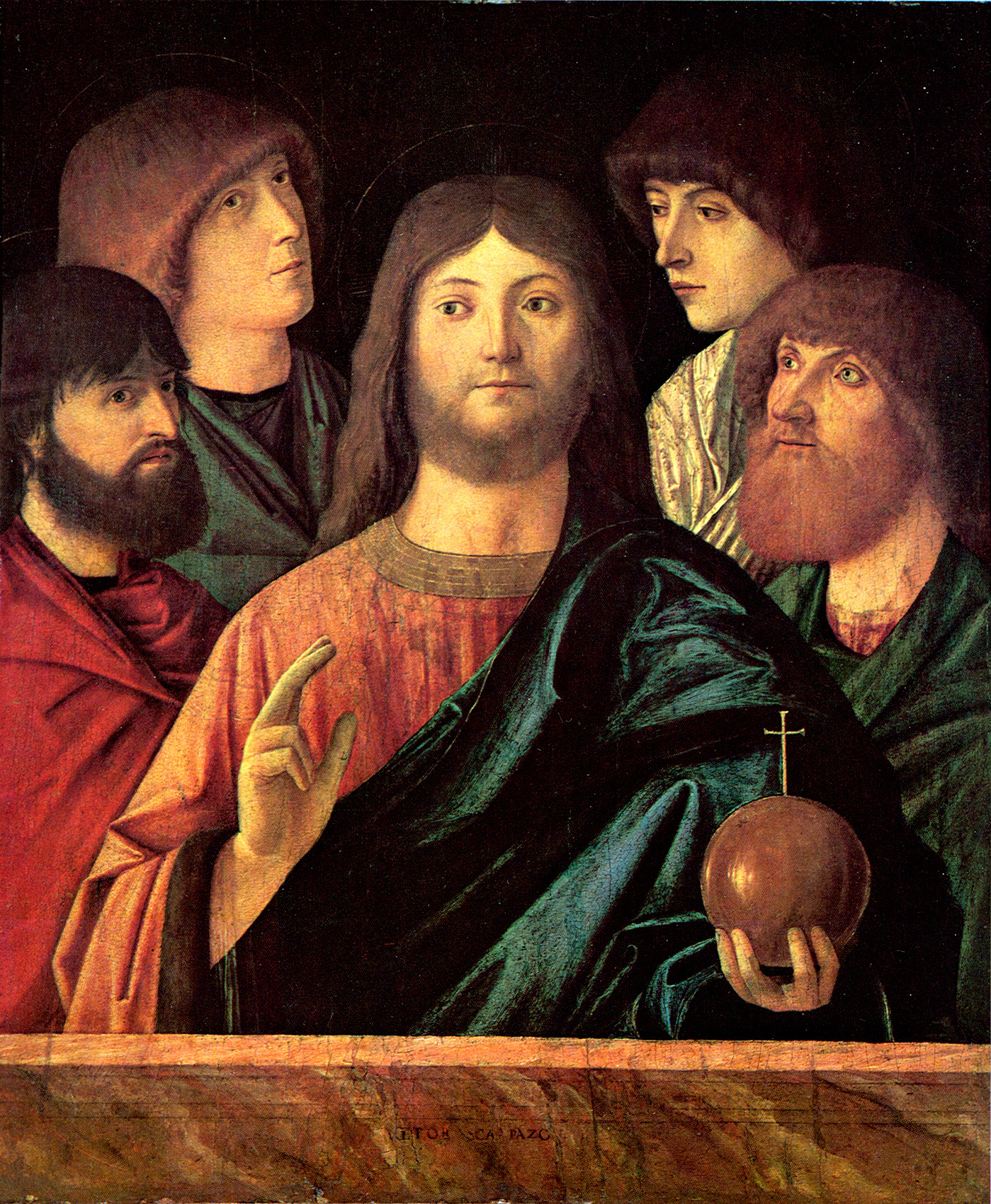
Vittore Carpaccio, Salvator Mundi with Four Saints (c. 1489/90) owned by the Fondazione Luciano Sorlini in Carzago di Calvagese (in Brescia)

Carpaccio's earliest known solo works are a Virgin and Child (c. 1488 or 1489) at the Museo Correr (Fondazione Musei Civici di Venezia) and the Salvator Mundi with Four Saints (c. 1489 – c. 1490) owned by the Fondazione Luciano Sorlini in Carzago di Calvagese (in Brescia). The Virgin and Child reflects the influence of works from the Bellini workshop (Giovanni Bellini and Giovanni Bellini) – especially the Virgin's hands and headdress, along with the figure of the Christ Child. Carpaccio may have also been influenced by the works of Lazzaro Bastiani and Alvise Vivarini, Venetian painters of an older generation. The black backdrop of the Salvator Mundi (Savior of the World) was likely influenced by Antonello da Messina's Salvator Mundi (1475-76). Furthermore, Antonello's use of rounded forms and volumes, along with the three-quarter views of the four surrounding saints likely influenced the aspiring, although immature, style of Carpaccio.

Carpaccio's Madonna and Child with Two Saints (c.1485-1510) was destroyed during World War II. It was stored in a flak tower in Berlin for safe keeping, but in May 1945, the tower was set on fire and most of the objects inside were destroyed.

== Principal works (1490–1520s) ==
Carpaccio's principal works were executed between 1490 and 1519, placing him among the early masters of Venetian painting in the Renaissance.

By 1490, Carpaccio painted The Legend of Saint Ursula, a series of paintings for the Scuola di Sant'Orsola, one of the religious confraternities in Venice (see below "Narrative Cycles" for more on this series). This series elevated his prominence in early Renaissance Venice, allowing him to distinguish himself as a capable, creative painter skilled in artistic narration and lighting.

Around 1501–1507, he worked with Giovanni Bellini, painting in the Sala del Gran Consiglio in the Doge's Palace. Like many other major works, the cycle was entirely lost in the fire of 1577.

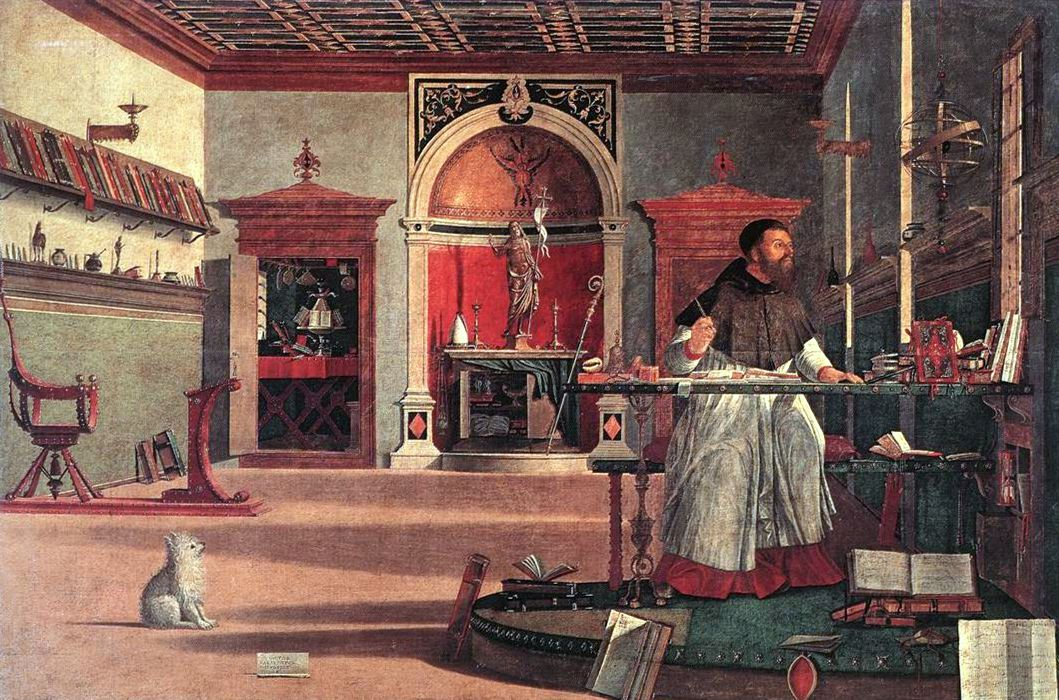
Saint Augustine in His Study

Shortly after the year 1502, Vittore Carpaccio's Saint Augustine in His Study was painted and signed with the inscription: VICTOR / CARPATHIVS / FINGEBAT. The artist situates the saint in an idealized interior domestic space, alluding to contemporary practices in the art of collecting during the Renaissance period. This painting showcases how objects associated with collecting are meant to spill out within a space and between the rooms of a house. On the left wall of the painting, sculptures, Etruscan vases, and a Mamluk metalwork candlestick are displayed on a shelf, referencing objects that were highly sought after during that time and valued in Renaissance art collecting.

Carpaccio completed additional narrative cycles and expanded his oeuvre. Between 1502 and 1504, he portrayed episodes from the lives of Saint Jerome and the Virgin Mary.

The legend of Saint George is referenced in his painting, St. George Baptizing the Selenites (1507). According to the Golden Legend, George, a Christian knight, rescues a Libyan princess who has been offered in sacrifice to a dragon. Horrified that her pagan family would do such a thing, George brings the dragon back to her town and compels them to be baptized. The legend of St. George was enormously popular during the Renaissance, and the confrontation between the knight and the dragon was painted later by numerous artists, such as Albrecht Altdorfer's St. George and the Dragon (1510).

From 1507 to 1508, Carpaccio executed the work, St. Tryphonius Exorcizing the Demon.

In 1508, he joined a committee established to assess the frescoes painted by Giorgione, which had been commissioned by the Fondaco dei Tedeschi, a trading post for German merchants.

Carpaccio appears to have been influenced by Cima da Conegliano, as evidenced in the Death of the Virgin from 1508, at Ferrara. In 1510, Carpaccio executed the panels of Lamentation on the Dead Christ and The Meditation on the Passion, where the sense of sorrow found in such works by Mantegna is backed by extensive use of symbolism. The theme of death is evident in The Meditation on the Passion, as Christ's body sits on a throne with pseudo-Hebrew inscriptions. In the background sit leafless trees, crumbling buildings, and a dry, desert ground—all alluding to the theme of death. During the same year, 1510, Carpaccio paintedYoung Knight in a Landscape, now located in the Thyssen-Bornemisza Collection of Madrid.

In the early 1510s, Carpaccio began to experiment with other formats, particularly altarpieces and other devotional works on a smaller scale. However, he experienced less success upon the rise of younger artists, such as Titian, Giorgione, and Lorenzo Lotto, whose innovative styles challenged his conservative values. Nonetheless, he designed various altarpieces for Venetian churches, including St. Thomas Aquinas Enthroned (1507), Presentation of Christ in the Temple (1510), and Martyrdom of the Ten Thousand (1515), while he also continued to paint for a more modest community of provincial patrons.

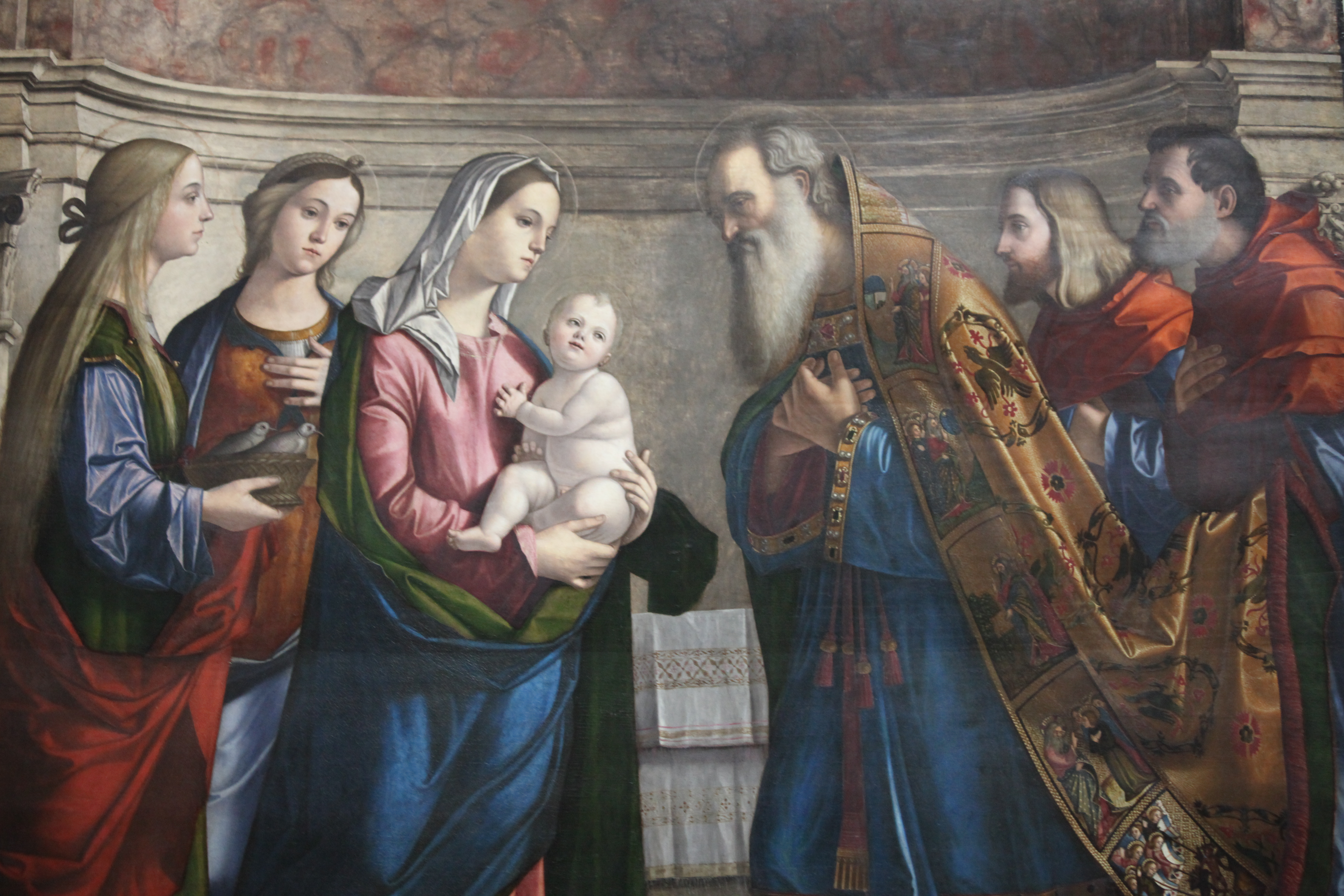
Detail of Presentation of Jesus in the Temple (1510)

Between 1511 and 1520 he finished five pictures on the Life of St. Stephen for the Scuola di Santo Stefano. One of those paintings, The Ordination of Saint Stephen (1511), an oil on canvas, is located today in the Gemäldegalerie, Berlin.

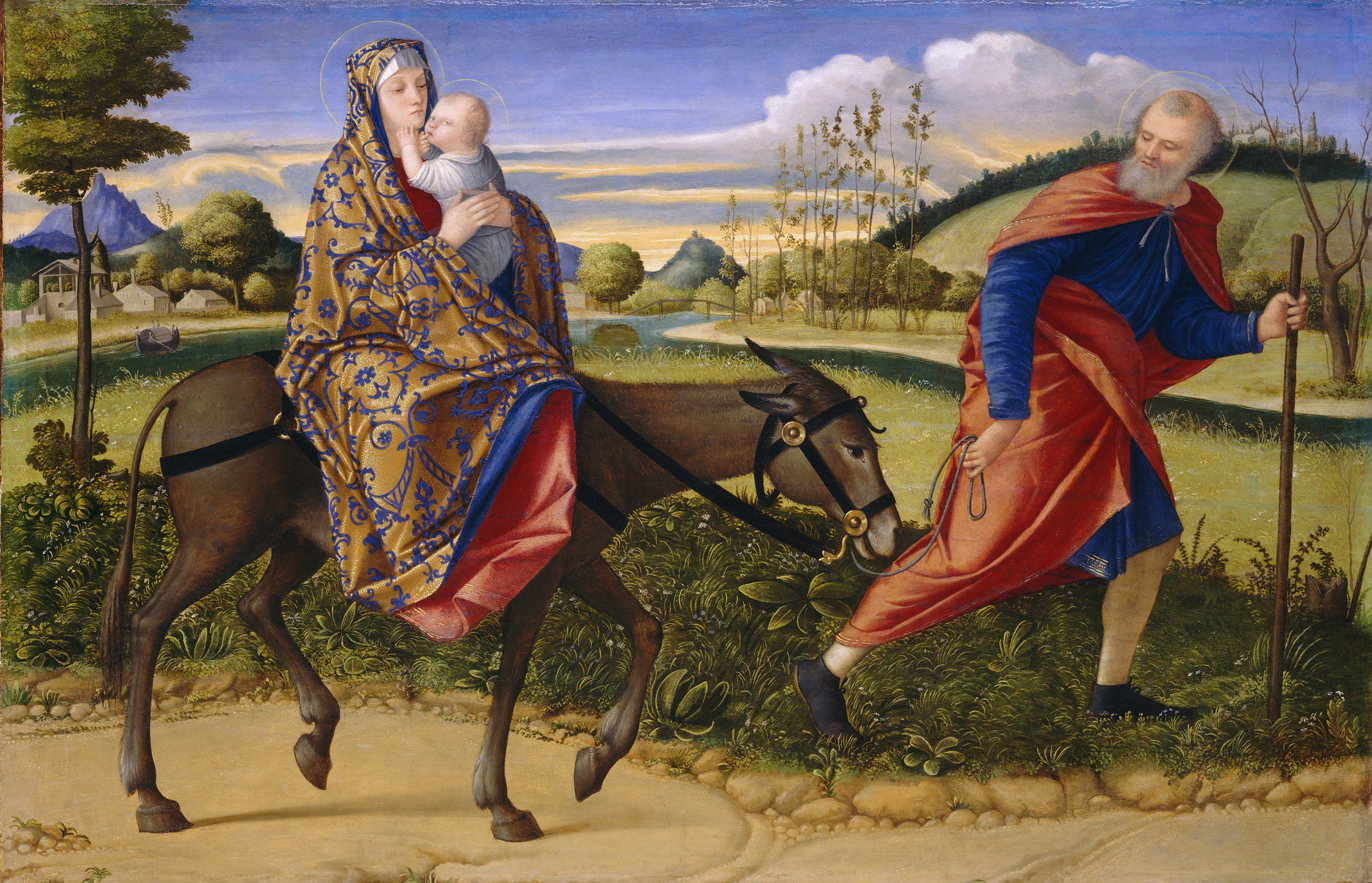
Vittore Carpaccio, The Flight into Egypt, c. 1515, oil on panel, The National Gallery of Art, Washington, D.C. (Andrew W. Mellon Collection, 1937.1.28)

Carpaccio's Saint George and the Dragon (1516), an oil on canvas painting located in the Abbazia di San Giorgio Maggiore, Benedicti Claustra Onlus, (Venice), positions St. George as the dragon-slayer to symbolize the triumph of Christian values over the devil (represented as a dragon). Although uncommon in the iconographic depictions of St. George, St. George Baptizing the Selenites offers a good example of the type of oriental (eastern) subjects that were popular in Venice at the time: great care and attention is given to the foreign costumes, and hats are especially significant in indicating the European construction of the exotic. In The Baptism scene, one of the recent converts has placed his elaborate red-and-white, jewel-tipped turban on the ground in order to receive the sacrament. Fortini Brown argues that this increased interest in exotic eastern subject matter was a result of worsening relations between Venice and the Ottoman Turks: "as it became more of a threat, it also became more of an obsession."

In 1516, he painted a Sacra Conversatione painting in the then-Venetian town of Capo d'Istria (now Koper in Slovenia), which is hanging in its Cathedral of the Assumption. Carpaccio created several more works in Capo d'Istria, where he spent the last years of his life and also died.

=== Narrative cycles and Altarpieces ===
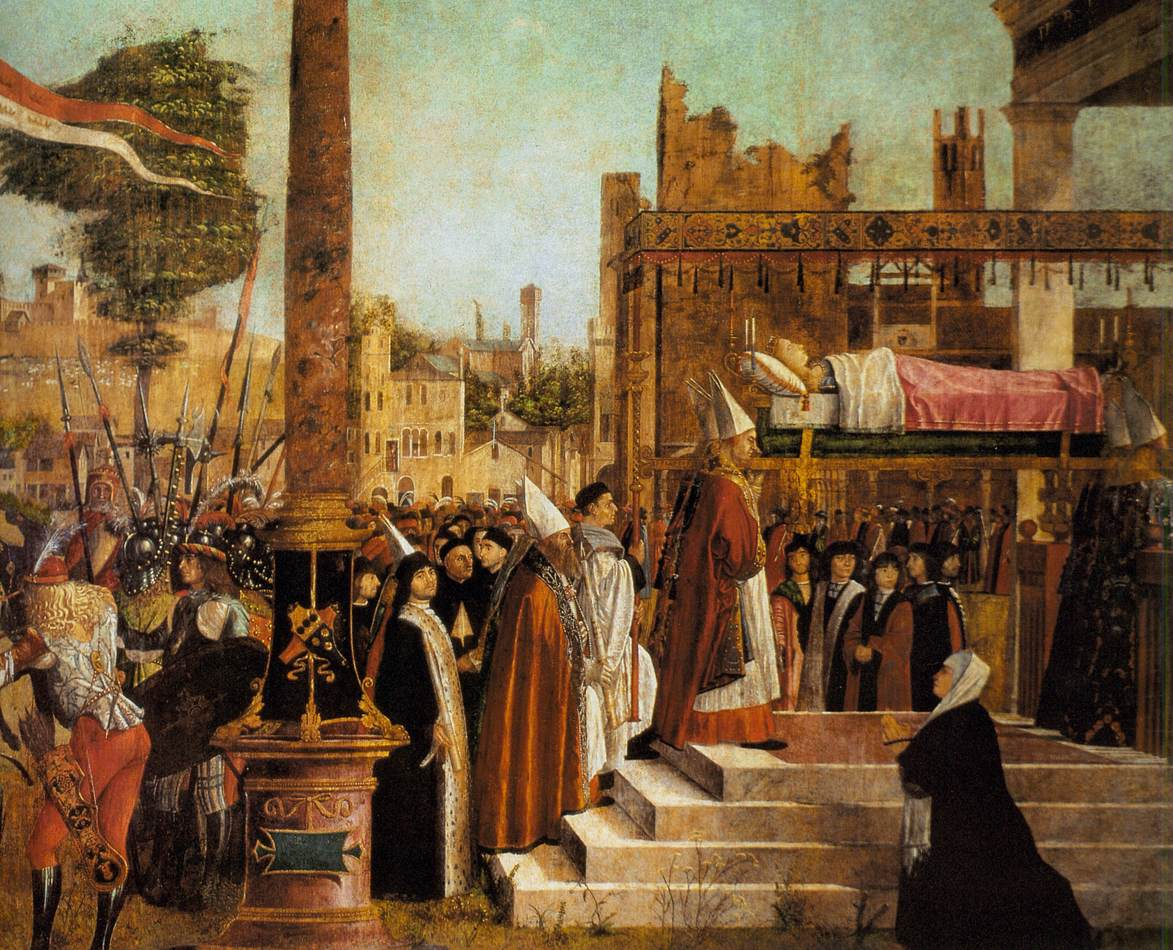
Martyrdom of the Pilgrims and the Funeral of St. Ursula 1490-94

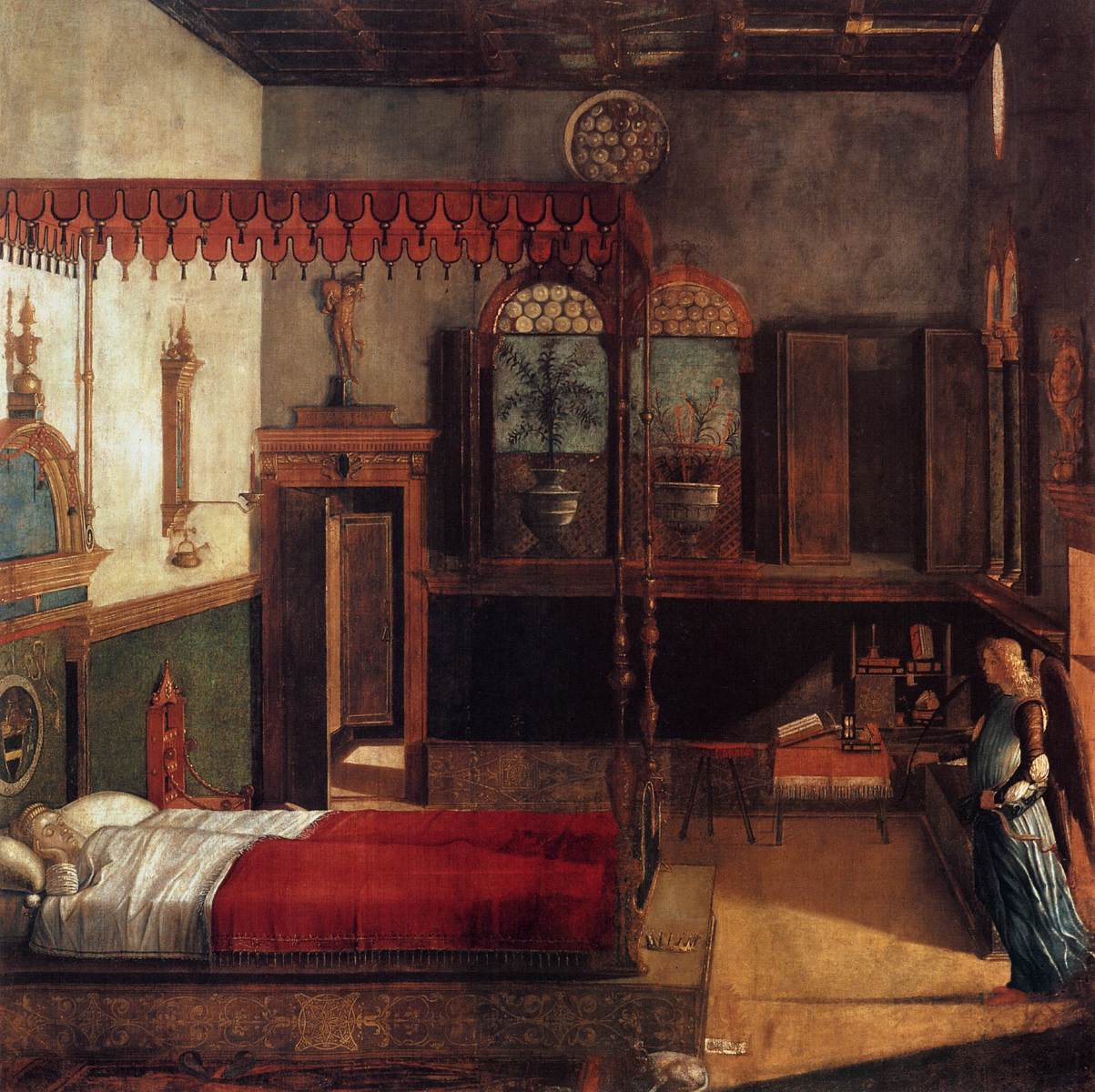
Dream of St. Ursula 1490-94

==== The Legend of Saint Ursula Cycle ====
In 1490, Carpaccio began The Legend of Saint Ursula, a series of paintings executed for the Scuola di Sant'Orsola depicting the life of the confraternity's patron saint. The Scuola di Sant'Orsola was a well-established confraternity where many individuals across the social spectrum would come together and engage in civic-oriented work. This cycle has led scholars to describe him as a "master visual storyteller," since the large-scale paintings were installed in large open spaces, like a reception or audience hall, allowing spectators to take in the scenes, similar to animation storyboards.

The subject of Carpaccio's paintings, which are housed in the Gallerie dell'Accademia, was drawn from the Golden Legend of Jacopo da Varagine. The legend revolves around St. Ursula and her companions in Cologne where tradition relates that in the year 385, a legion of eleven thousand virgins professing their faith to Christ, with Ursula at their head and twenty thousand Christians by their side, would be massacred by the Germans upon their arrival in Cologne after coming from the island of Britain. Carpaccio was greatly inspired by the legend, especially its themes of massacre and chronology that brought the story to life.

The cycle of paintings expresses a fantastical tone that is reminiscent of Giovanni Bellini and Gentile Bellini. It would take Carpaccio about seven years to complete all nine paintings and over the course of the seven years his artistic style would mature. Carpaccio's use of perspective, depth, and dimension were key points of improvement throughout his series, as observed by various art historians. One of the most notable paintings in The Legend of Saint Ursula series is the Arrival of St. Ursula at Cologne (1490), which recalls the work of Jacopo Bellini in its elemental treatment of light and atmosphere. In the Dream of St. Ursula (1490), Carpaccio paints the story of heavenly love where St. Ursula is visited by an angel in her dream informing her that she will die and become a martyr of Christ. By 1495, in the Departure of St. Ursula, the largest canvas of the series, his treatment of color, geometric perspective, and figural composition would reflect his careful study and mastery over Venetian narrative art form. The piece illustrates a town teeming with people, while simultaneously flaunting splendor by including marbles, expensive fabrics, and architecture inspired by the eastern Mediterranean.

==== The Schiavoni and Albanesi Cycles ====
In the opening decade of the sixteenth century, Carpaccio embarked on works that scholars have argued made him one of the foremost orientalist painters of his age. From 1502 to 1507 Carpaccio executed another notable cycle of panels for the Scuola di San Giorgio degli Schiavoni which served one of Venice's immigrant communities (Schiavoni meaning "Slavs" in the Venetian dialect). Unlike the use of a continuous narrative sequence found in the St. Ursula series, wherein the main characters appear multiple times within each canvas, each work in the Schiavoni cycle concentrates on a single episode in the lives of Dalmatia's three patron saints: St. Jerome, St. George and St. Trifon. In the painting, Jerome Leading the Lion into the Monastery (1509), introduces a humorous, intimate mood. Another painting, St. George and the Dragon, explores themes of the Christian night vanquishing the Muslim infidel. These works are thought of as "orientalist" because they offer evidence of a fascination with the Levant: a distinctly Middle Eastern-looking landscape takes an increasing role in the images as the backdrop to the religious scenes. Moreover, several of the scenes deal directly with cross-cultural issues, such as translation and conversion.

The painting cycle of Life of the Virgin for Scuola degli Albanesi dates to 1504–1508 and was largely executed by Carpaccio's assistants. The images are now divided among the Accademia Carrara of Bergamo, the Pinacoteca di Brera in Milan, and the Ca' d'Oro in Venice.

==== Altarpieces ====
In 1491, Carpaccio completed the Glory of St. Ursula altarpiece, a large scale detachable wall-painting painted for the hall of one of the Venetian scuole, which were charitable and social confraternities. Three years later he took part in the decoration of the Scuola Grande di San Giovanni Evangelista, painting the Miracle of the Relic of the Cross at the Ponte di Rialto (1496). Other altarpieces that Carpaccio created, like St. Thomas Aquinas Enthroned (1507), Presentation of Christ in the Temple (1510), and Martyrdom of the Ten Thousand (1515), were commissioned by Venice churches. The church-patron of St. Thomas Aquinas Enthroned (1507) remains unknown; however, Presentation of Christ in the Temple (1510) was commissioned by the church of San Giobbe, and Martyrdom of the Ten Thousand (1515) by the church of San Giorgio Maggiore. After 1510, he painted for patrons in his province, sending his altarpieces to patrons in cities across the country. It has been argued that his altarpieces were not his best works, as they appeared unnatural and lacked fluidity when compared to the most influential altarpieces of the time.

== Artistic decline and death (1520s) ==
Towards the end of his life, the quality of his art began to decline, specifically following his Schiavoni pieces. The change in quality was remarked upon by the artistic community then and now. By contrast, the Italian Renaissance painter Giorgione made innovations in the field that Carpaccio was simply unable to match. The expectations and artistic demands had changed, resulting in Carpaccio's style seeming outmoded in comparison. He never altered his style to keep up with these new innovations. Carpaccio increasingly turned to the assistance of his sons Pietro and Benedetto, his principal pupils. However, he independently completed his final work, which consisted of decorating organ shutters for the Duomo at Capo d'Istria in 1523.

Carpaccio's late works were mostly done in the Venetian mainland territories, and in collaboration with his sons Benedetto and Piero. One of his pupils was Marco Marziale.

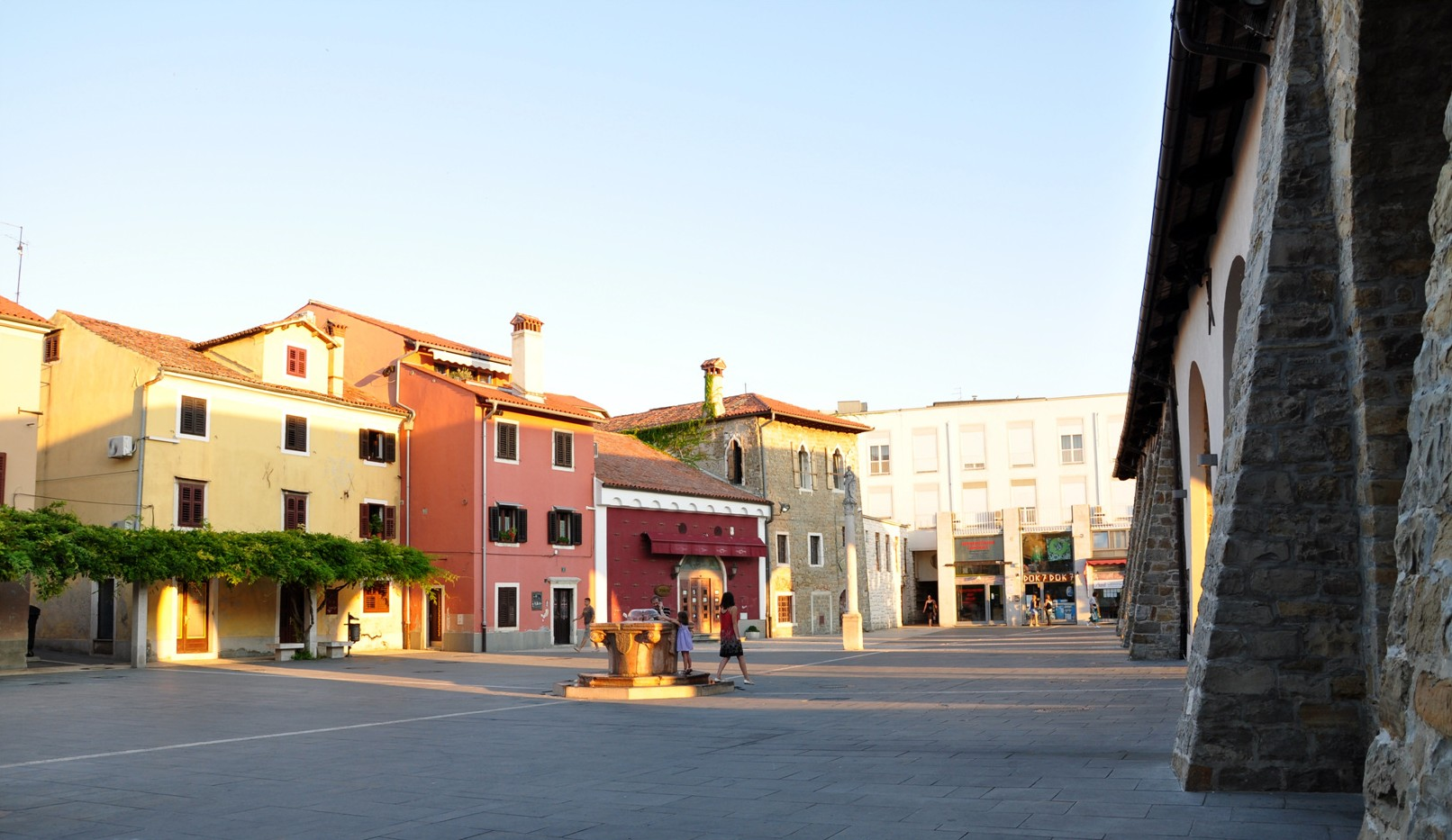
The Carpaccio House, believed to be the residence of Carpaccio and his sons, in the Istrian town of Capo d'Istria, also known as Capodistria (now Koper), Slovenia

He spent his final years in Capo d'Istria, where he died between 1525 and 1526.

== Style ==
Carpaccio was one of the first artists to include a cartellino into his paintings; he inserted it into select pieces in a way that made it appear as if the artist had left it there without thought.

In comparison to his mentor Giovanni Bellini, Carpaccio's works are overall less defined. Considered untraditional at the time, Carpaccio painted his altarpieces on canvas rather than on wood panel. In addition, he carried out thin priming, which resulted in a bolder look.

Carpaccio was observed to have played with the vanishing point in his works. For example, in St. Jerome In His Study, the vanishing point is to the right of the center. While he did still employ the traditional use of having the vanishing point be in the center, at times Carpaccio added a second vanishing point. In The Death of St. Jerome (1502), a second vanishing point was included below the primary one on the body of the saint. The effect was that the primary vanishing point broadcast imagery away from the observer, while the vanishing point below brought the imagery towards the observer.

Carpaccio paid special attention to architecture, depicting buildings precisely and accurately to ensure that his paintings reflected the new architectural elements in Venice.

== Legacy and influence ==
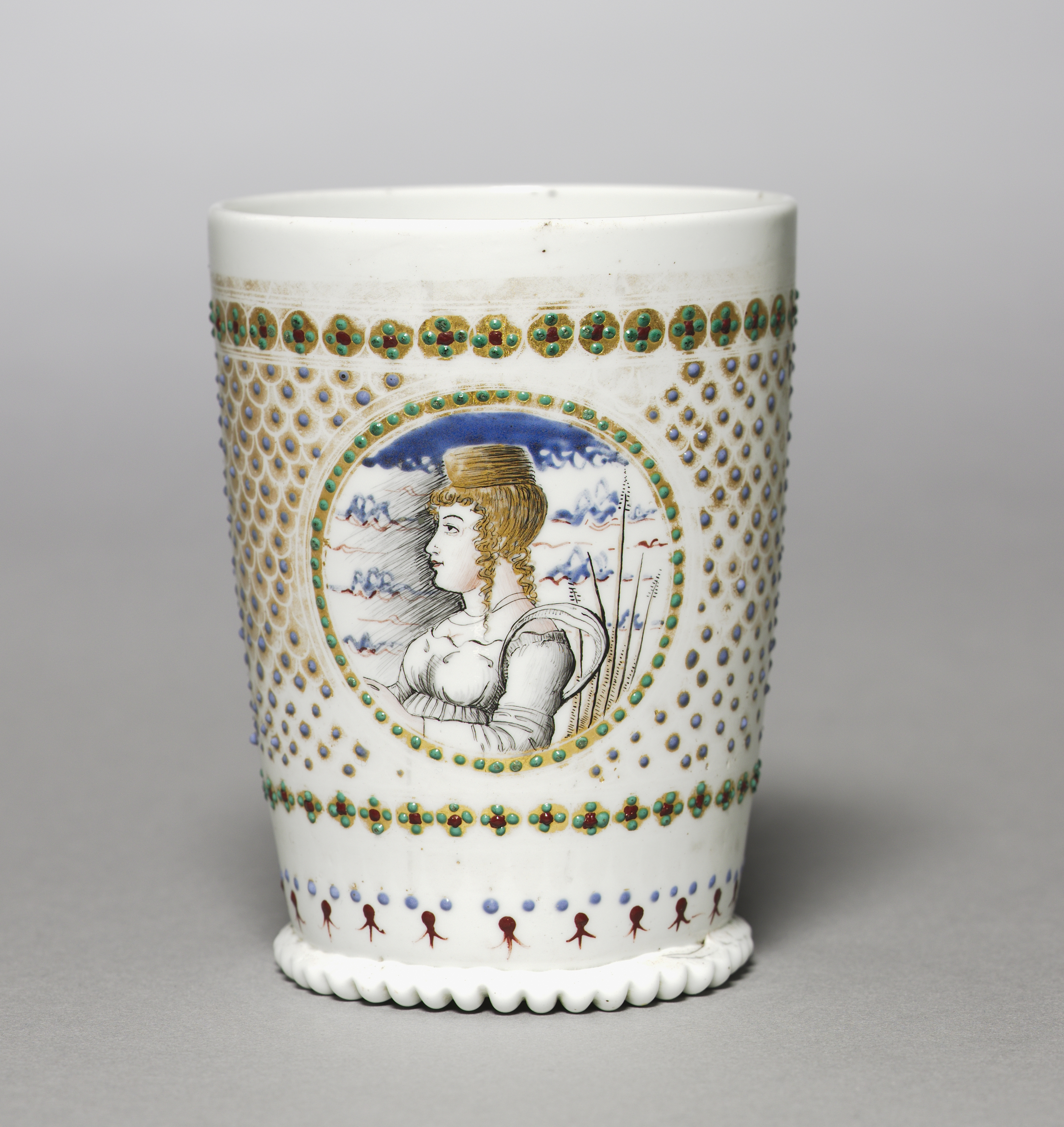
Milk-glass tumbler from Murano, inspired by Carpaccio's Two Venetian Ladies

Carpaccio transformed from being a member of a small furrier merchant family to being a prominent artist in Italy, with some scholars comparing his stature to Gentile Bellini. Unlike Bellini, Carpaccio worked mostly in what has been described as a more conservative-style of painting, a contrast to the growing humanist tendencies that were a prominent influence on other painters in Italy during his lifetime. His depiction of Venetian architecture and everyday life has greatly contributed to modern historians' conception of fifteenth-century Venetian culture. Most of Carpaccio's works have been relocated and are now displayed in the Gallerie dell'Accademia in Venice. Only one complete collection of paintings remains intact, which can be found along the walls of the Scuola di San Giorgio degli Schiavoni.

Later artists produced various works in the aftermath of Carpaccio's death and were inspired by his oeuvre. For instance, Paris Bordone's The Presentation of the Ring (1534), an oil painting, echoed Carpaccio's broad compositions, accurate representation of textiles and fabrics, and representation of a gathering of a confraternity. Carpaccio also influenced the glassware industry of sixteenth-century Murano. For instance, collections of milk-glass tumblers, especially those depicting brides to celebrate engagements, drew heavily from his painting Two Venetian Ladies (c. 1490). In 1950, the Italian dish known as carpaccio was invented by a chef in Venice. An exhibit of the artist Carpaccio’s work was being shown at that time, and his name was applied to the dish.

== Critical reception: then and now ==
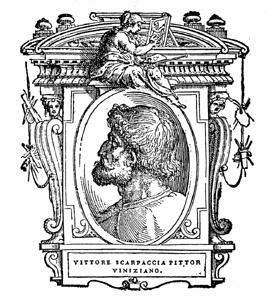
Portrait of Carpaccio by Giorgio Vasari, 1568

Carpaccio received modest acclaim during his lifetime, only occasionally creating works for the Venetian nobility. While regular employment was scarce, he primarily served a variety of working-class patrons that consisted of sailors, artisans, and tradesmen belonging to the scuole of the Albanesi and Schiavoni. He was also commissioned to create mainland works for Bergamo's parish church of Grumello de' Zanchi and a scuole in Udine. Outside of Venice, he received support from a few distinguished families, such as the della Rovere of Urbino.

While assessments among historians and scholars vary, many identify Carpaccio as one of the most significant contemporaries of Giovanni Bellini. Despite residing in the shadows of his mentors, he received recognition from contemporary scholars, writers, and critics. In his accounts on perspective, the Italian diplomat and architect, Daniele Barbaro, referenced Carpaccio's works. Similarly, in Giorgio Vasari's 1568 series Le vite de' più eccellenti pittori, scultori e architettori (The Lives of the Most Excellent Painters, Sculptors, and Architects), Carpaccio appeared at the forefront of a list of Venetian painters. (Note: Depictions of Carpaccio are both scarce and tentative. He may have included a self-portrait in the Disputation of St. Stephen and has been mistaken to be the subject of Vittore Greco's Portrait of a Man. A more definite portrayal, Portrait of Carpaccio, can be found in Vasari's Vite of 1568.) This decision distinguished his artistic reputation from other painters in northern Italy.

Interest in Carpaccio resurged in the nineteenth century as English writer and art critic John Ruskin celebrated the Venetian painter's attention to detail. Ruskin likened Carpaccio's works to a "...magic mirror which flashes back instantly whatever it sees beautifully arranged ..." The nineteenth-century Italian painter Pompeo Marino Molmenti held a similarly high view, regarding Carpaccio as "...the most truthful chronicler of a people living in the full meridian of their glory." In the twentieth century, increased recognition of Carpaccio's works culminated in the 1963 retrospective exhibition that took place in the Doge's Palace in Venice. According to several scholars it was this exhibition in Venice that in turn inspired a local chef, Giuseppe Cipriani (founder of Harry's Bar in Venice), to name a dish (thinly sliced raw beef) after the painter and his use of vibrant reds.

The first ever retrospective of his art outside of Italy, Vittore Carpaccio: Master Storyteller of Renaissance Venice was exhibited at Washington, D.C.'s National Gallery of Art, November 20, 2022 – February 12, 2023, with an accompanying exhibition catalog, Vittore Carpaccio: Paintings and Drawings. A comprehensive publication with the same title as the exhibition was simultaneously released. The exhibition brought together forty-five paintings and thirty drawings made by Carpaccio, including the NGA's Virgin Reading (c. 1505), which had recently undergone conservation work. It is planned for the exhibition to travel to the Palazzo Ducale, Venice, to be on view from March 18 to June 18, 2023.

== Gallery ==
Vittore Carpaccio

Holy Pilgrim and St. Sebastian National Museum of Serbia (1495)

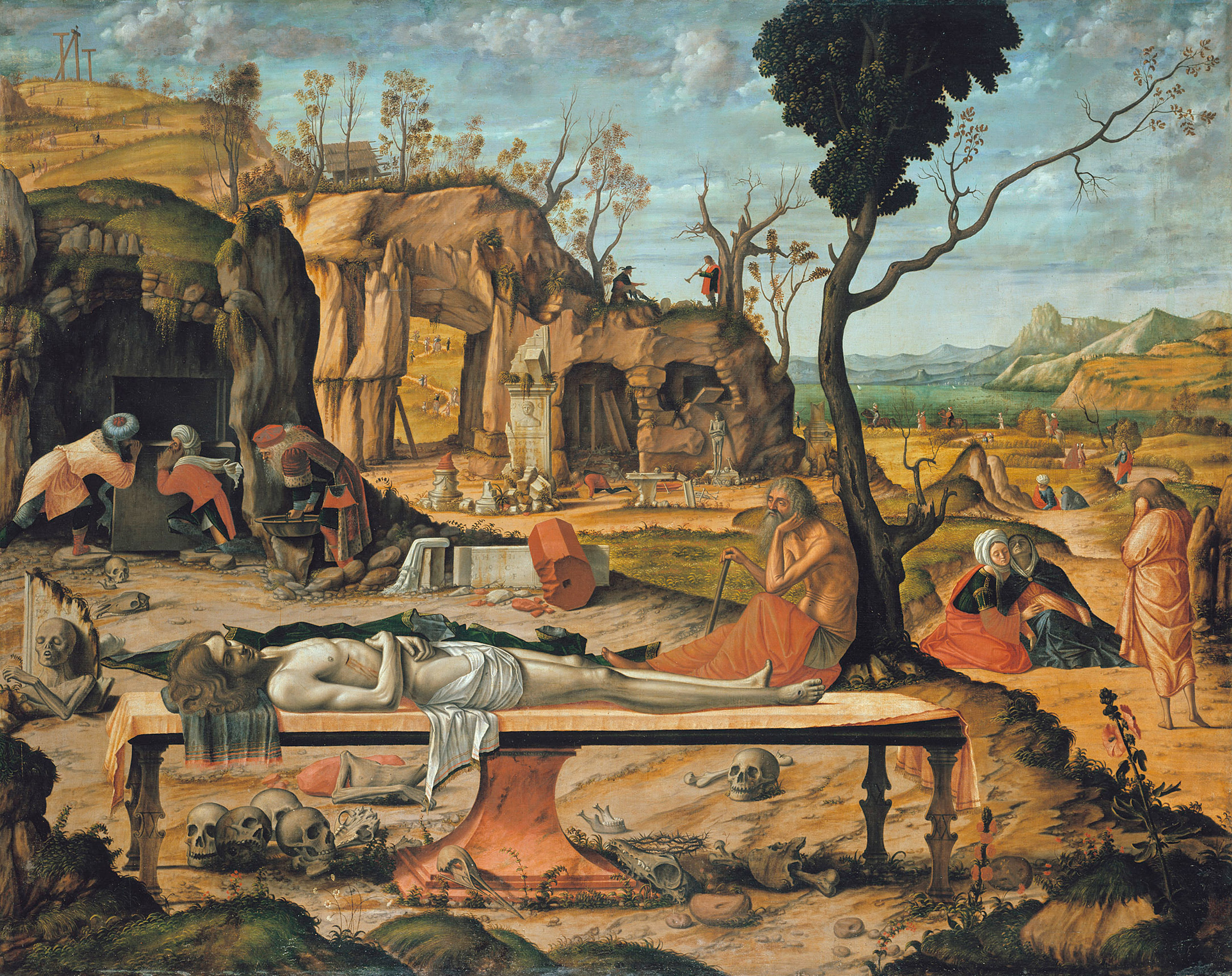
Preparation of Christ's Tomb (1505), Staatliche Museen, Berlin

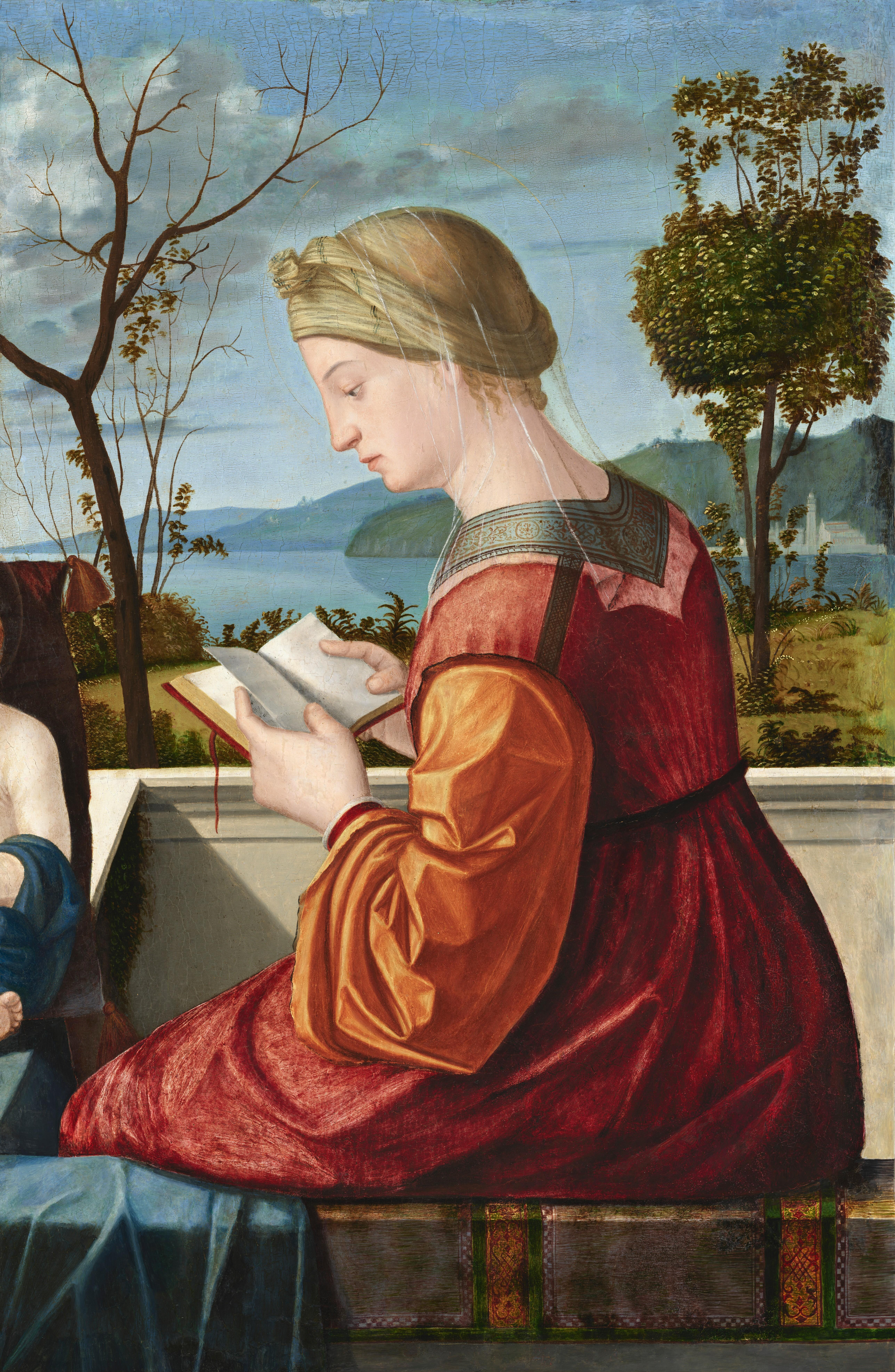
The Virgin Reading (c. 1505), oil on panel transferred to canvas, National Gallery of Art (Samuel H. Kress Collection, 1939.1.354)

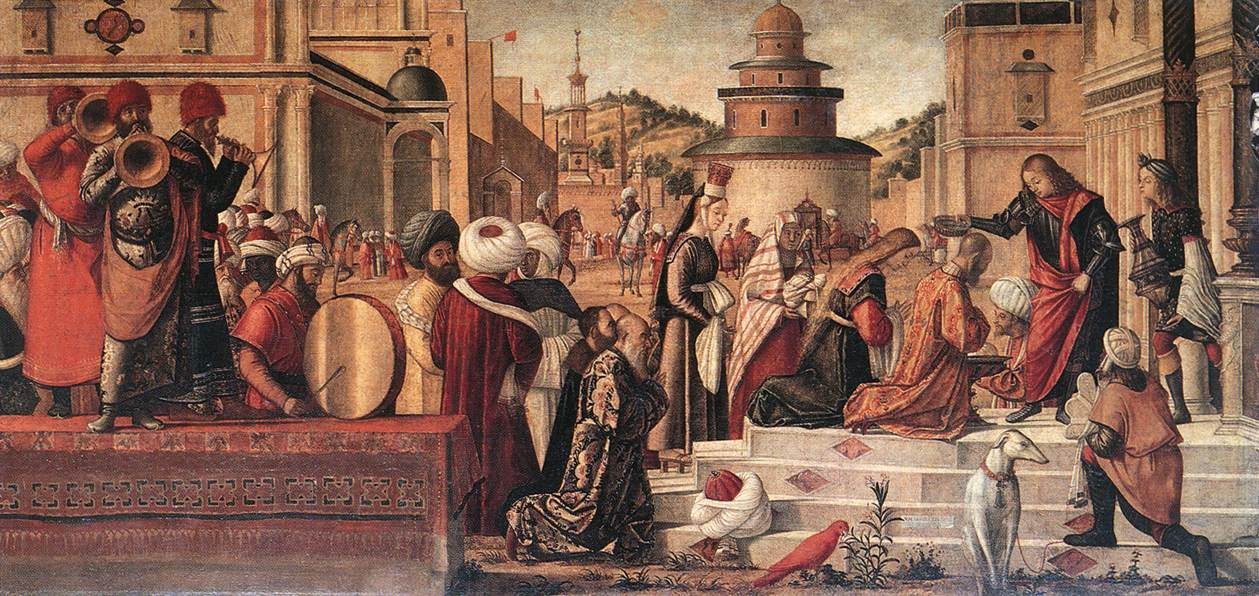
St. George Baptizing the Selenites (1507), Scuola di San Giorgio degli Schiavoni, Venice

Young Knight in a Landscape (1510), Thyssen-Bornemisza Museum, Madrid

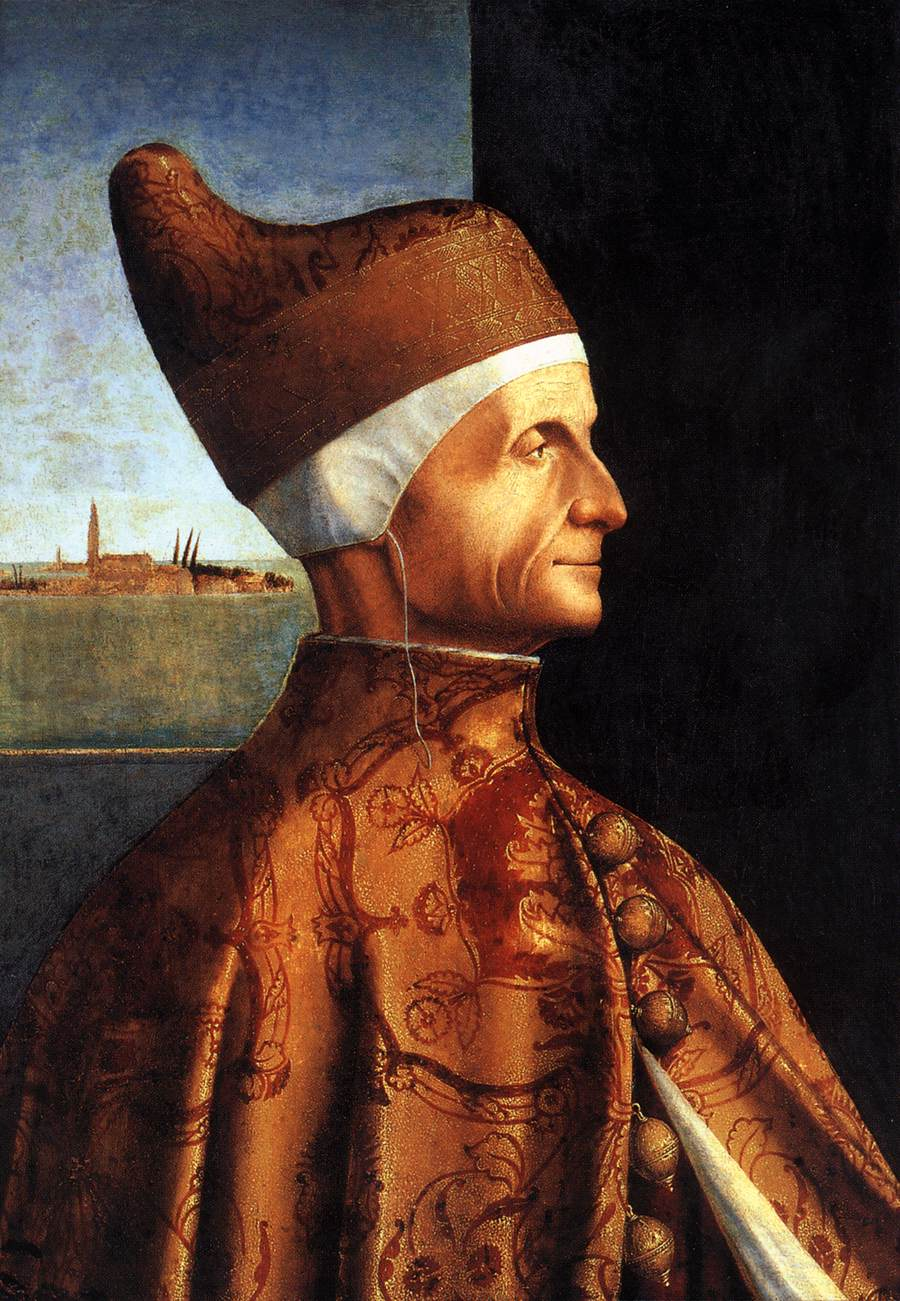
Portrait of the Doge Leonardo Loredan (1510), Accademia Carrara di Belle Arti di Bergamo

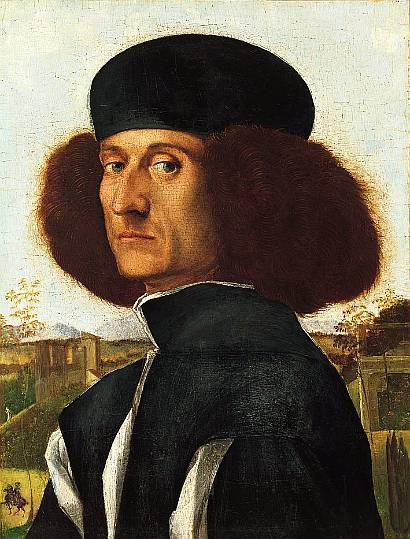
Portrait of a Venetian Nobleman (c. 1510) Norton Simon Museum, Pasadena

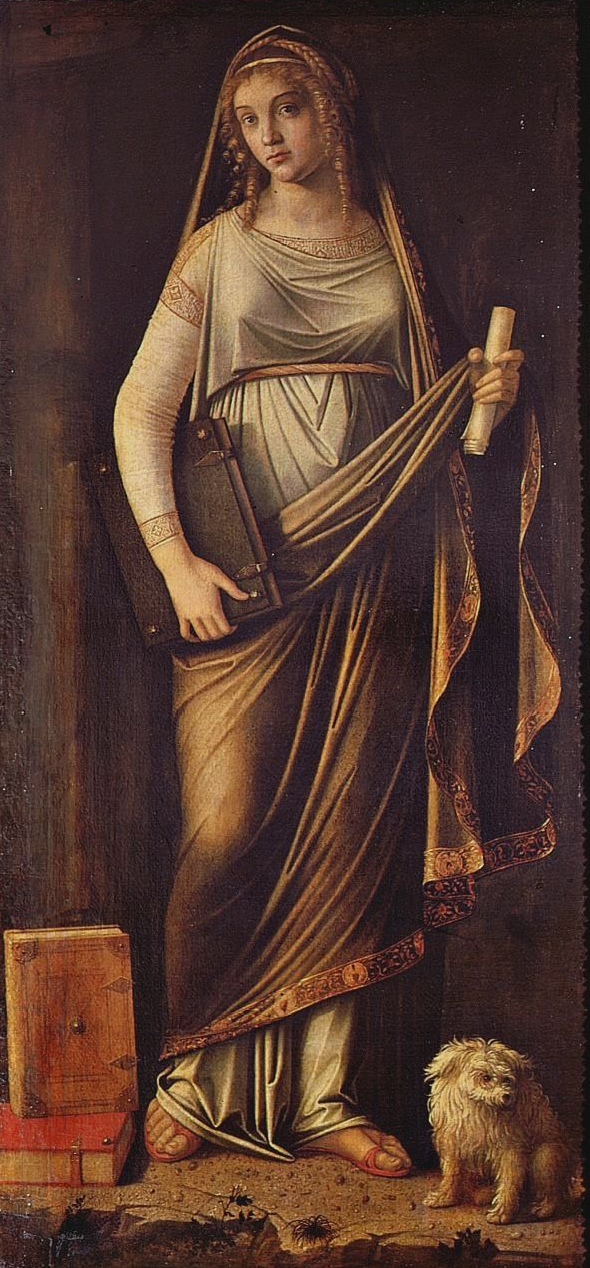
Sibyl (c. 1510), Uffizi, Florence

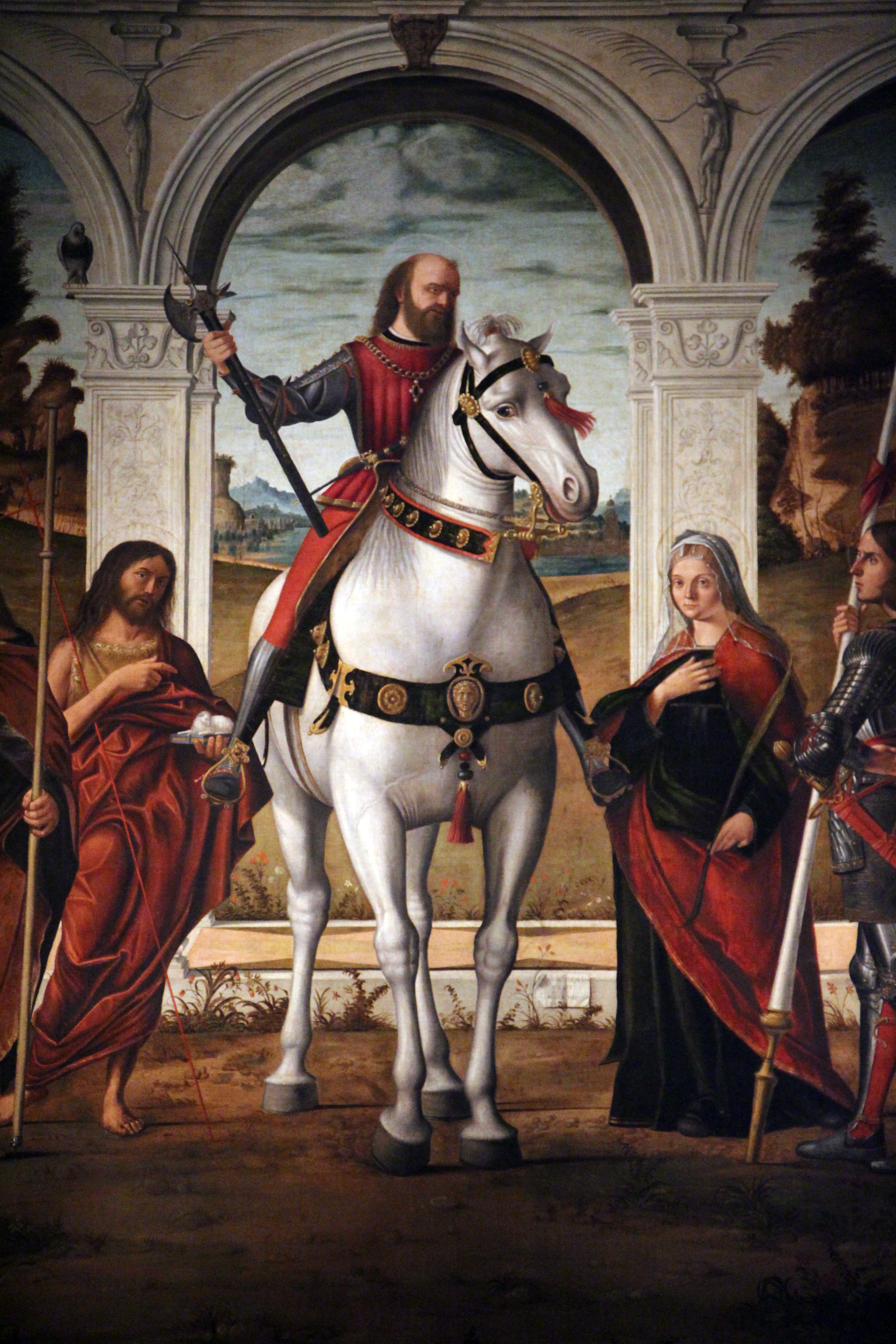
San Vitale on horse (1514)

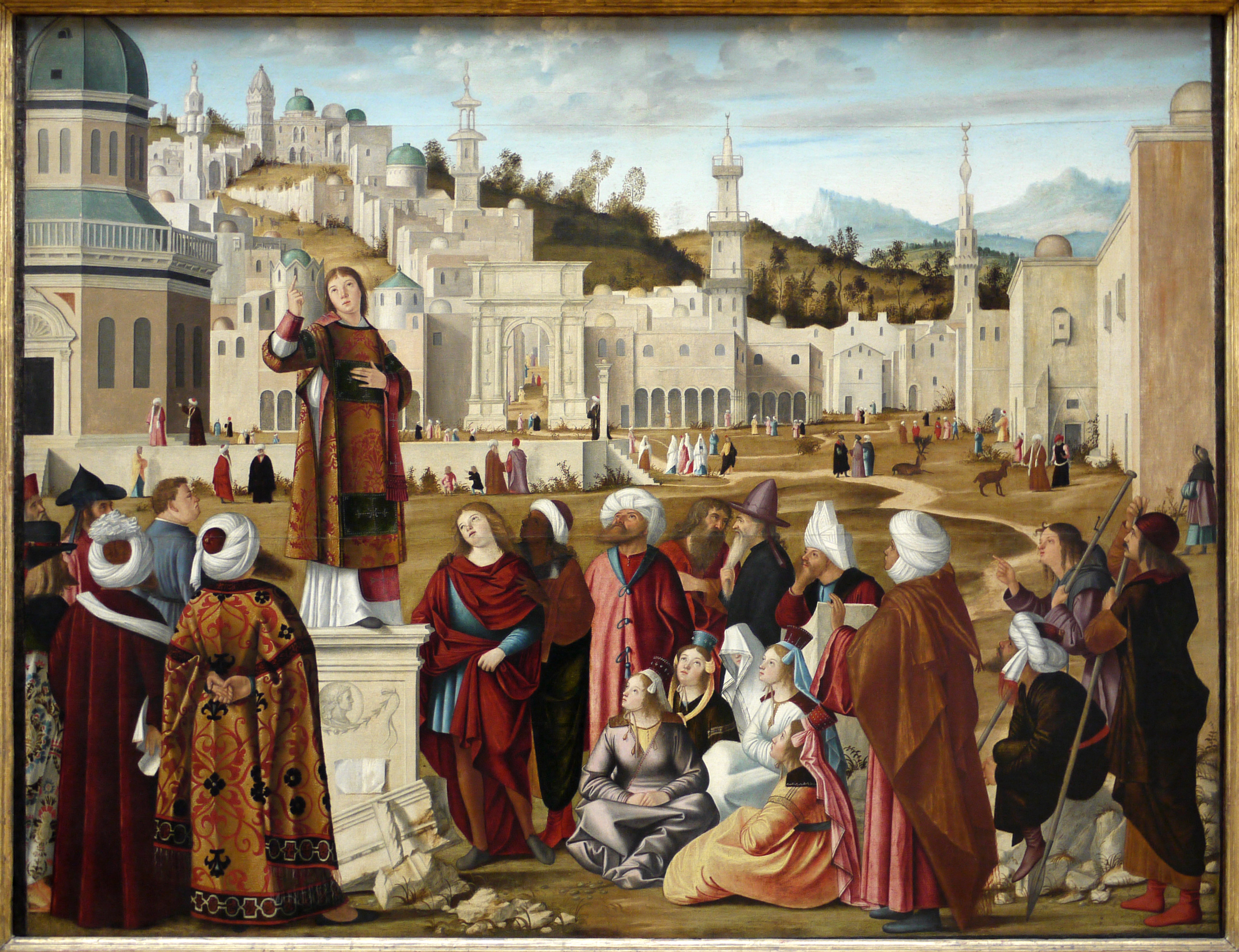
The Sermon of St. Stephen (1514), Louvre, Paris

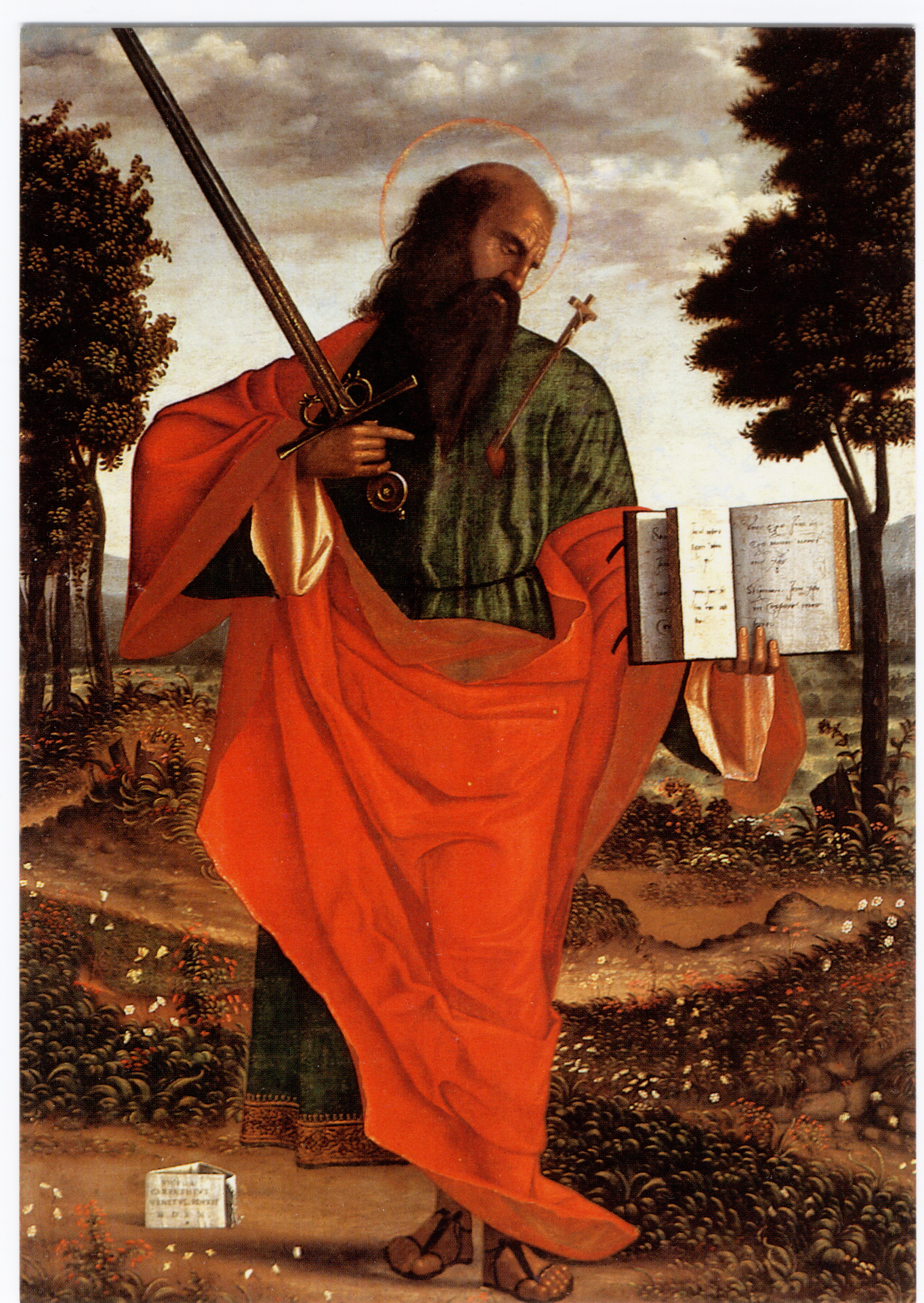
St. Paul (1520), San Domenico, Chioggia

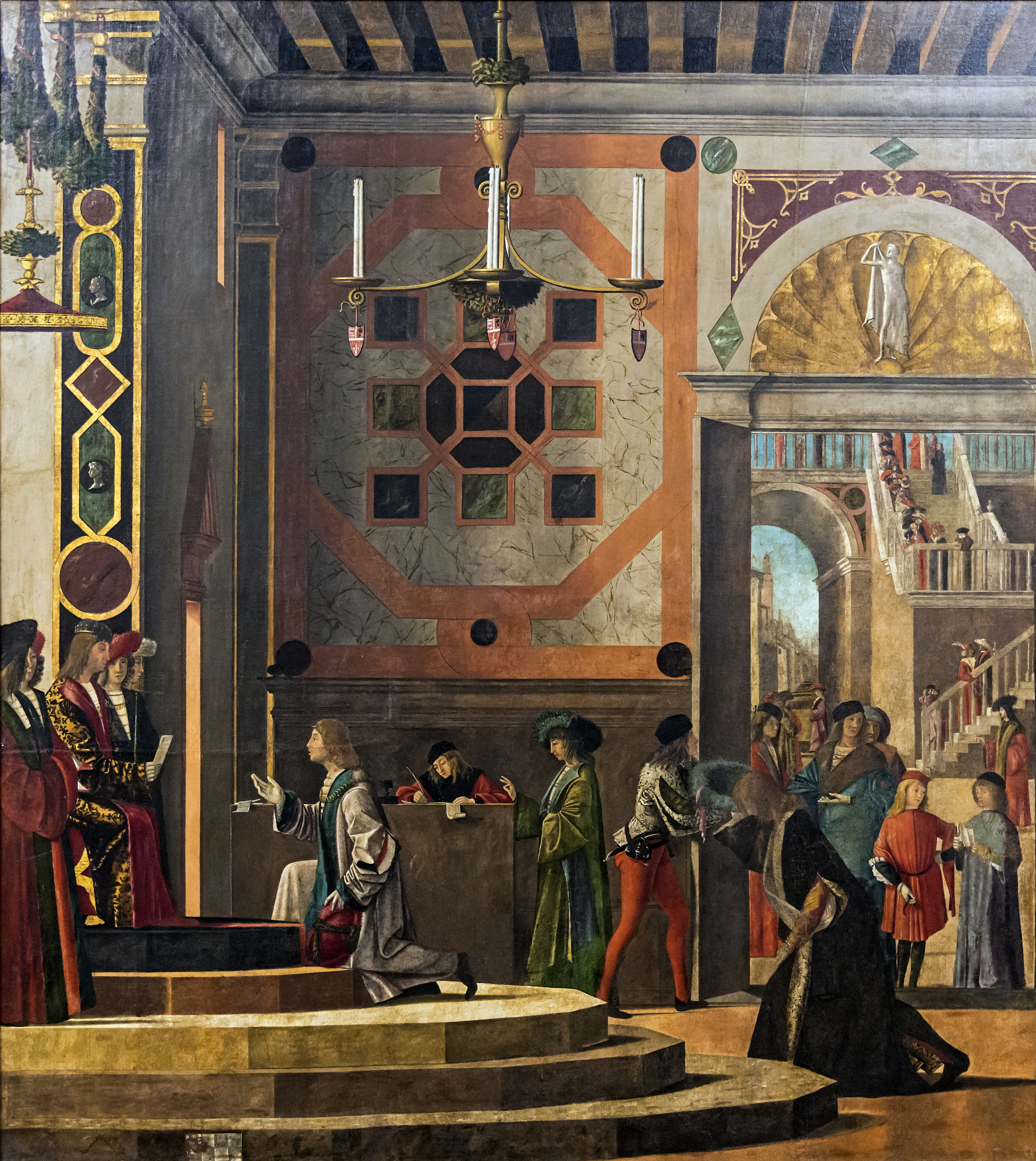
Sant' Orsola polyptych Gallerie dell'Accademia, Venice

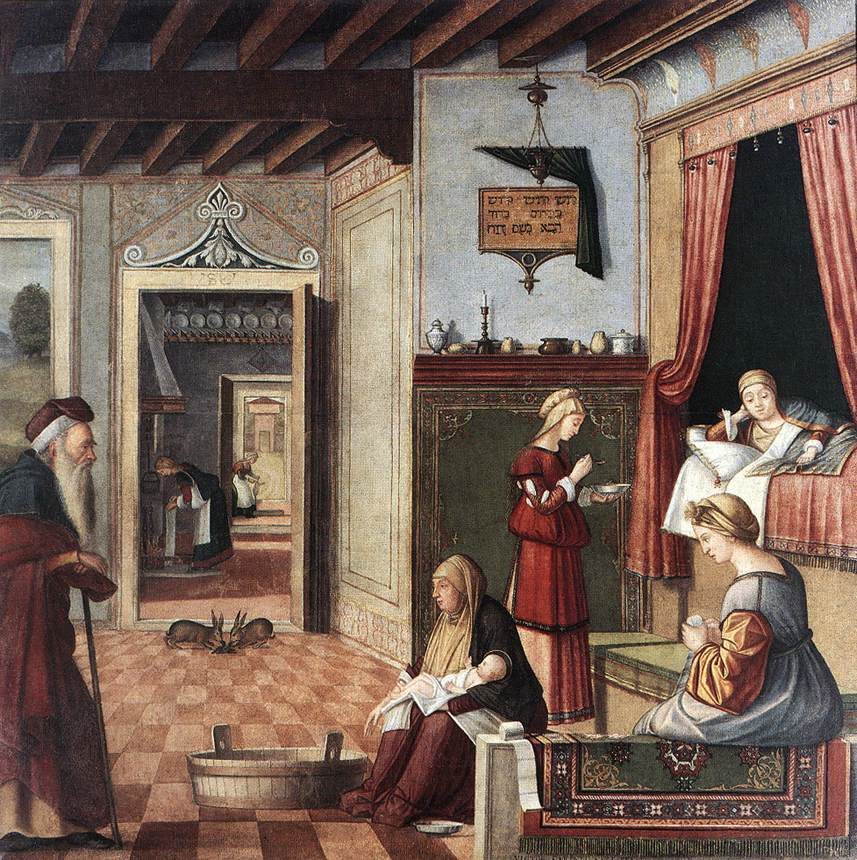
Birth of the Virgin (c. 1502), oil on canvas, Accademia Carrara di Belle Arti di Bergamo

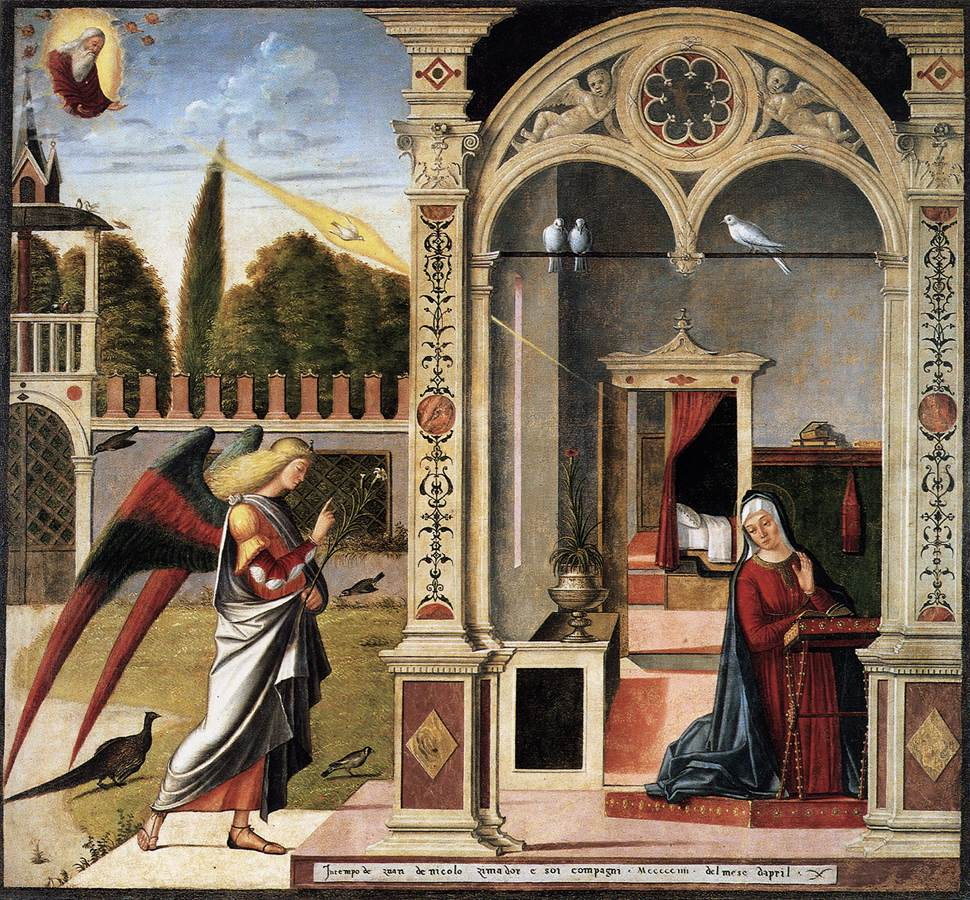
Annunciation, Ca' d'Oro, Venice

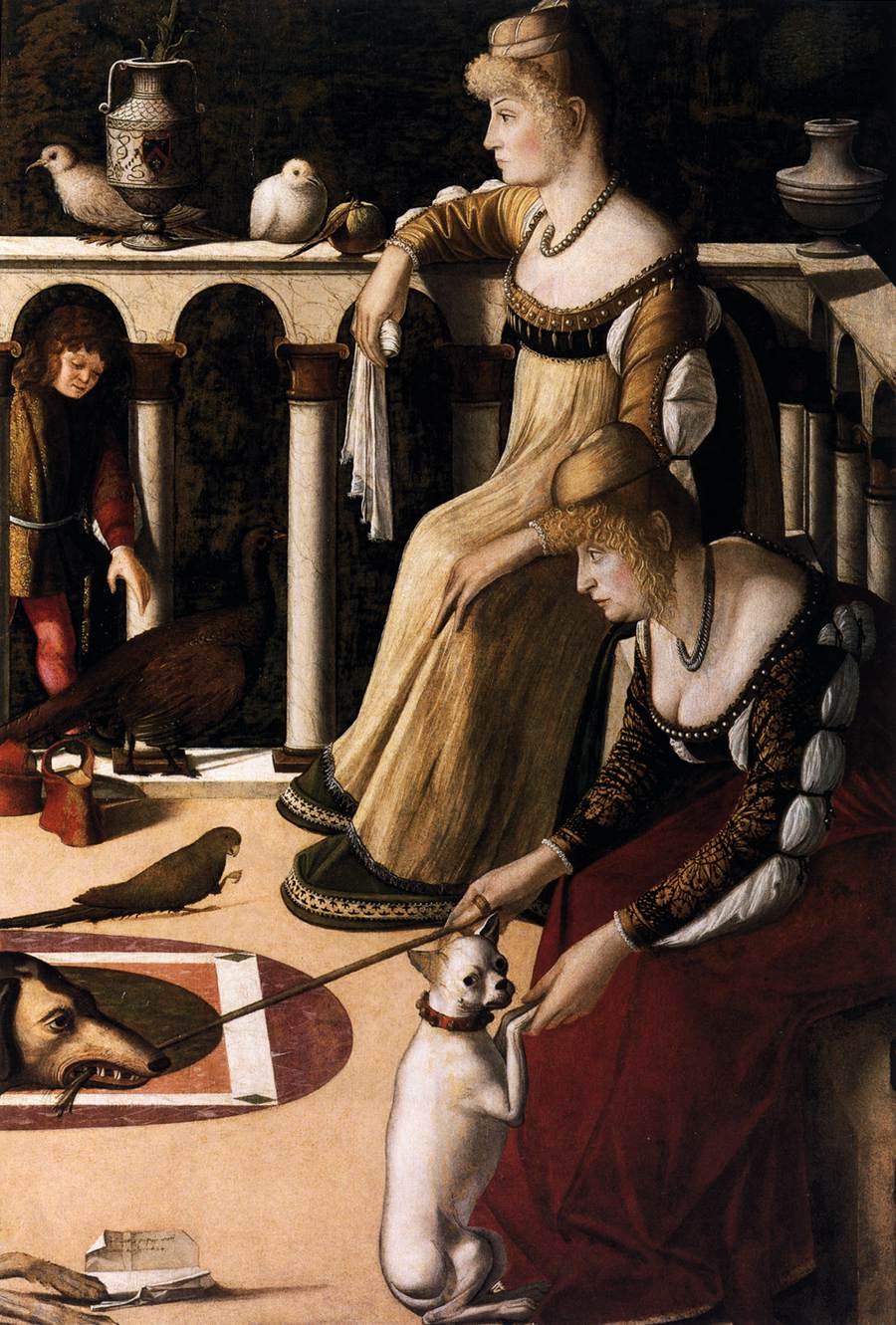
Two Venetian ladies, Museo Correr, Venice

Hunting on the Lagoon, Getty Center, Los Angeles

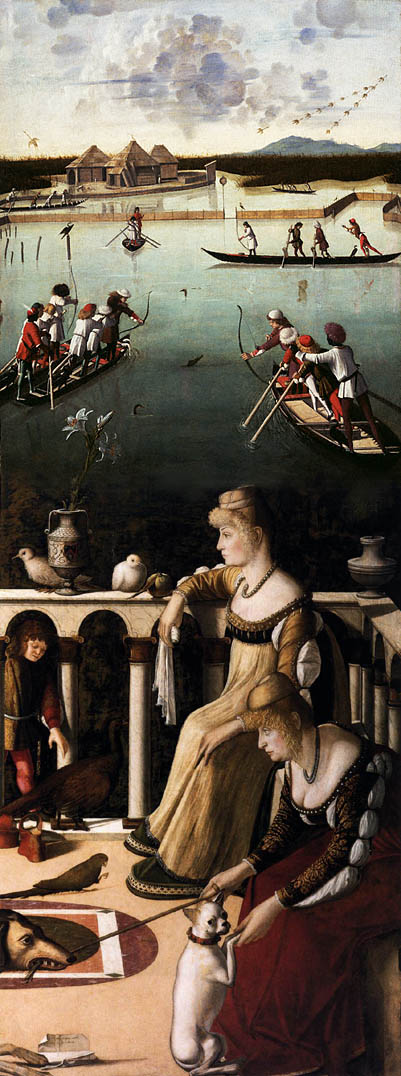
"Hunting on the Lagoon" & "Two Venetian Ladies" (reconstruction)

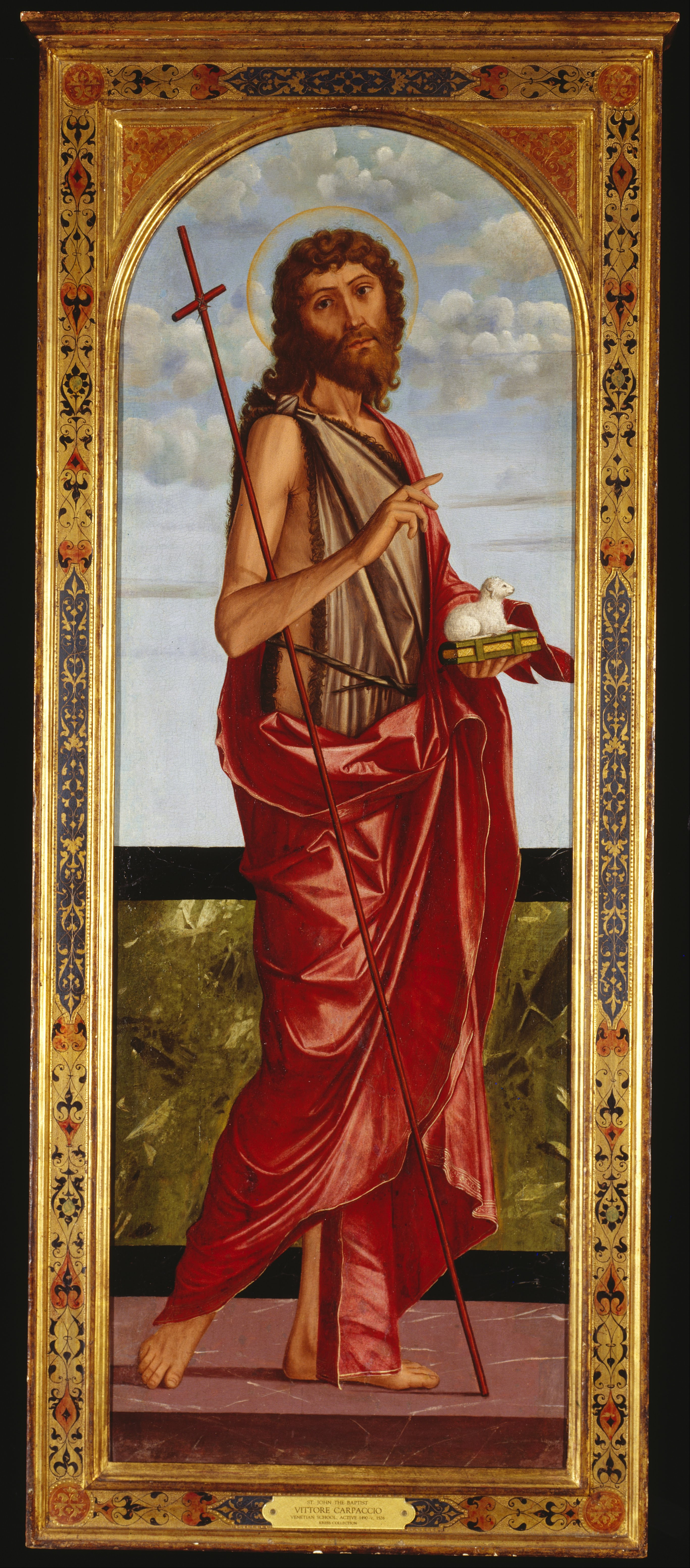
Saint John the Baptist, Philbrook Museum of Art, Tulsa

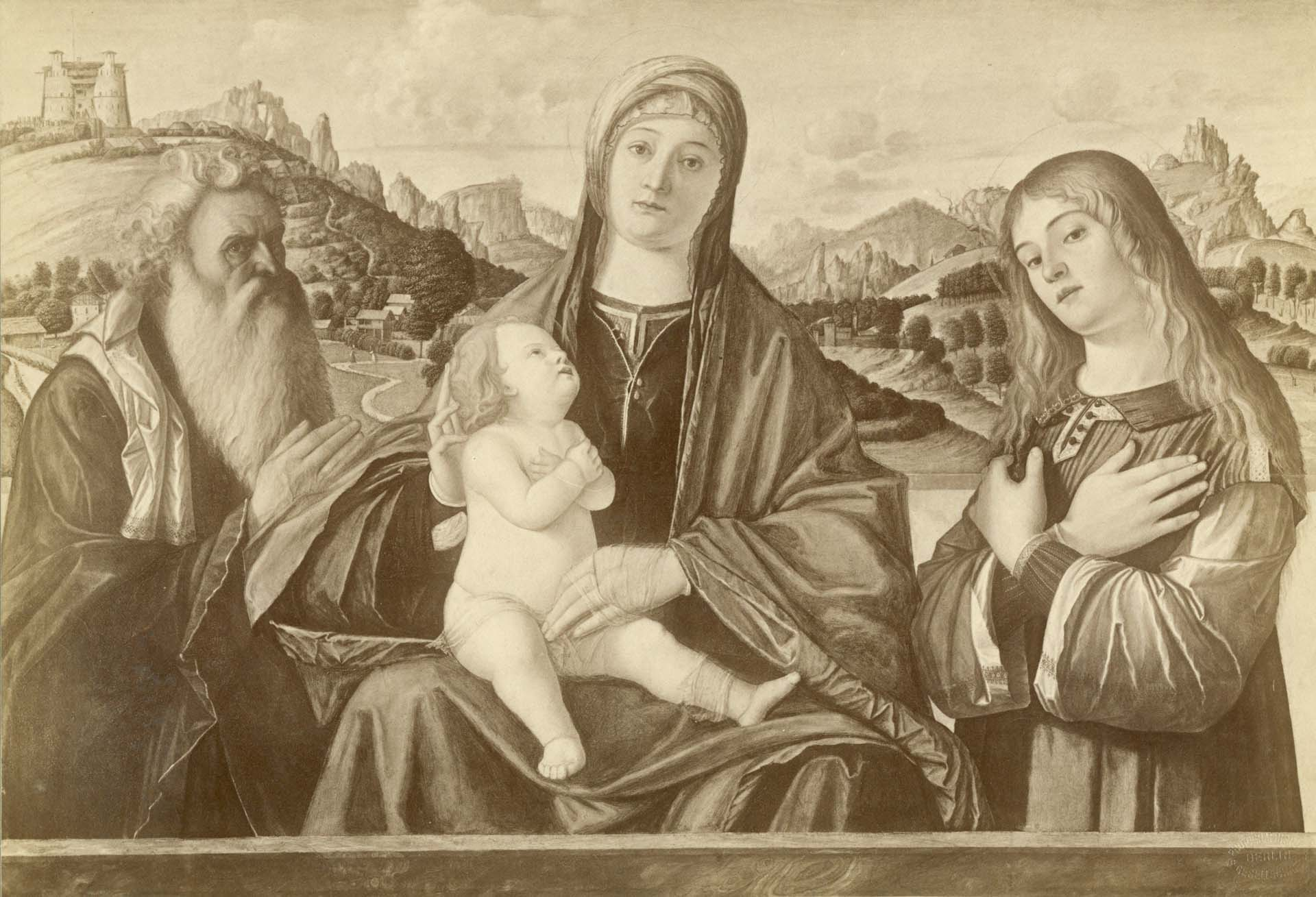
Madonna and Child with Two Saints, c. 1485-1510, formerly the Kaiser Friedrich Museum, Berlin, destroyed 1945 in the Flakturm Friedrichshain fire.
