= Portrait of a Man (Baldung) =

Painting by Hans Baldung

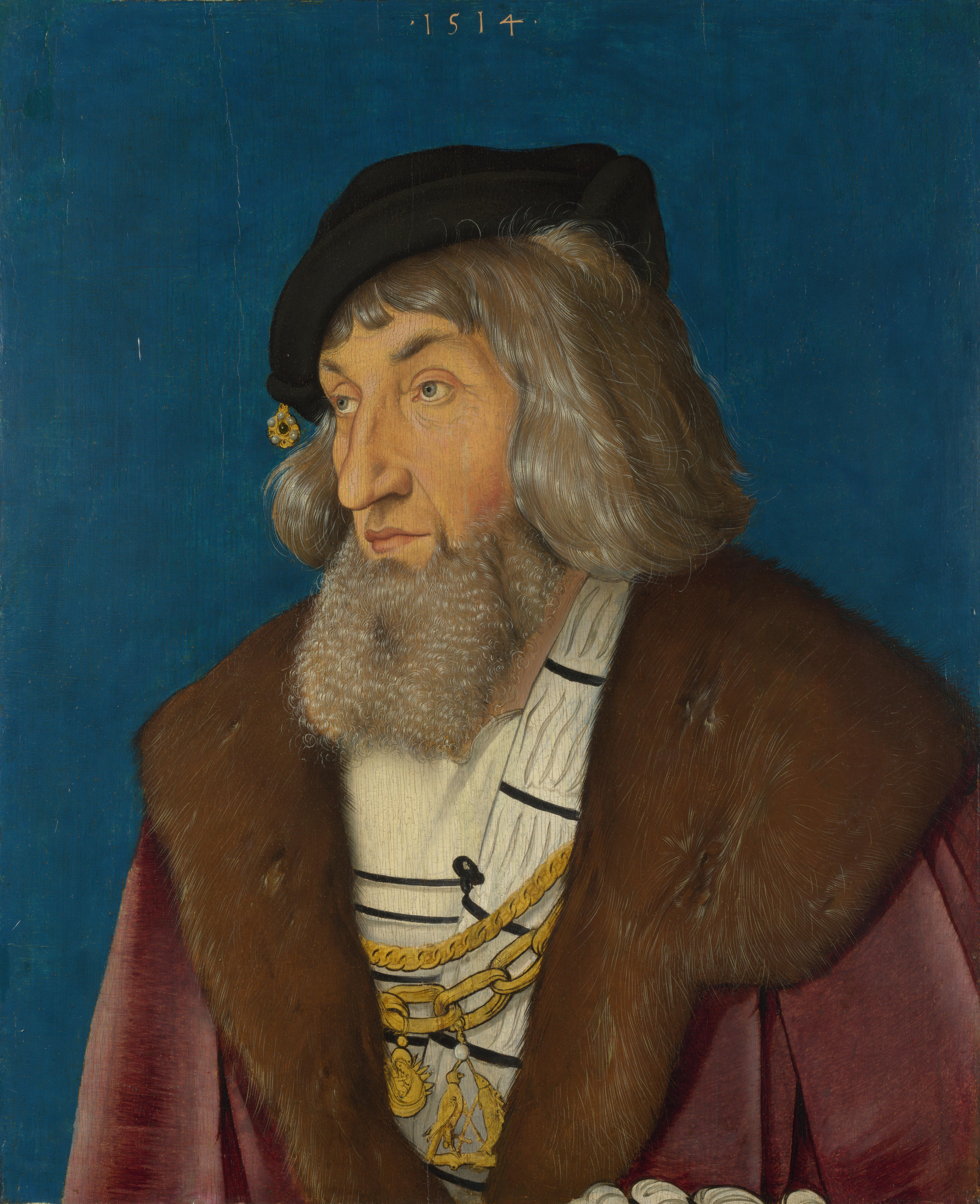
Portrait of a Man (1514), by Hans Baldung

Portrait of a Man is a 1514 oil-on-panel painting by the German artist Hans Baldung, who may have worked in Albrecht Dürer's studio. It is now in the National Gallery, London, which bought it in 1854. Baldung's portraits are less introspective than Dürer's but have greater immediate visual impact, here reinforced by the bright blue background and the rich clothing and chains.

Its subject is a rich nobleman, probably from Swabia, wearing two medallions hanging from golden chains . One of them shows the Madonna and Child (symbol of the Company of Our Lady of the Swan, an order exclusively for the nobility founded by Frederick II, Elector of Brandenburg) and the other shows a falcon with a fish (symbol of the Company of Knights of the Falcon and the Fish). His puffed sleeve is barely visible, suggesting the work originally showed most of the subject's arms but was later cut down.
