= Mariegola =

Venetian manuscript book of corporate statutes

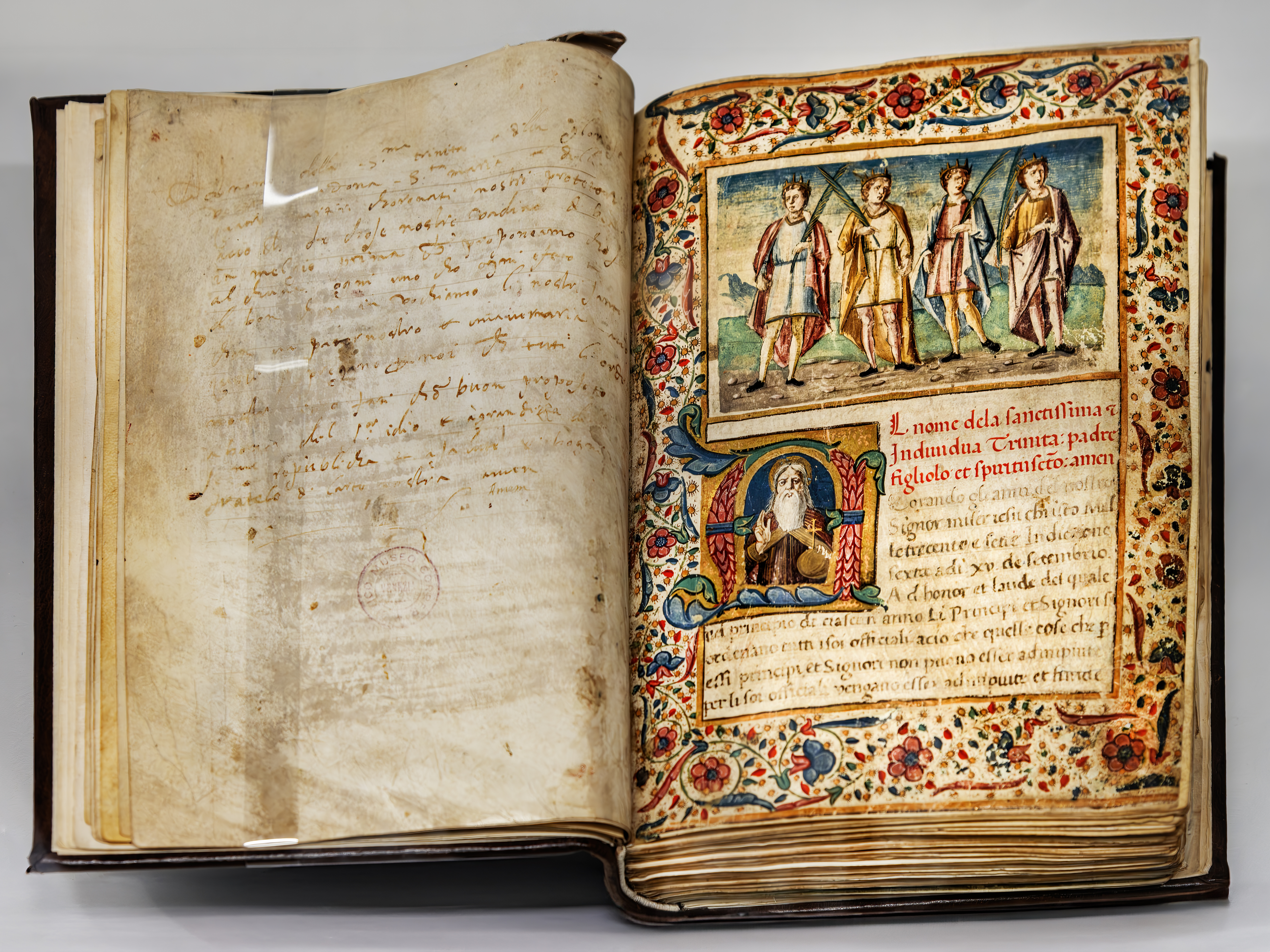
A 1518 illuminated page from the mariegola of the Venetian stonecutters' guild (tagiapiera), on parchment and now in the Museo Correr (Cl. IV 150).

A mariegola (plural mariegole) is a Venetian term for a manuscript statute book used by confraternities, craft and professional guilds (arti), and related corporate associations in the Republic of Venice. A mariegola set out the constitutions and regulations of an organization and could also contain membership lists, inventories of property, deliberations, and other institutional records.

The statutory traditions preserved in mariegole extend back into the thirteenth century, but the date of an underlying statute may be substantially earlier than the surviving manuscript in which it was copied. The earliest surviving illuminated mariegole date from the early fourteenth century. Surviving books range from comparatively utilitarian manuscripts to elaborately illuminated codices. Many were cumulative documents, receiving later statutes, deliberations and confirmations, while others were recopied in new redactions. In confraternal settings the bound book could also acquire devotional and ceremonial functions. Mariegole are important sources for the social, religious, economic and institutional history of Venice, as well as for the study of manuscript production and manuscript illumination.

== Etymology and terminology ==
Mariegola is the Venetian form corresponding to Italian matricola. The word is derived from Latin matricula ("register"), a diminutive of matrix. In specialist usage, however, a mariegola denotes the statute book as a whole, not merely a membership roll.

A traditional interpretation, also found in historical scholarship, derives the word from Venetian mare ("mother") and regola ("rule"), yielding the gloss "mother rule".

The term was specific to Venetian institutional usage rather than a generic name for all Italian confraternity or guild statutes. Within the Venetian context, however, it encompassed the books of devotional and charitable confraternities, craft and professional organizations, and some associations defined by common geographical origin.

== Historical development ==
The date of a statutory text, the date at which it was copied into a particular book, and the date of the book's illumination may differ. The critical edition of the mariegola of the Venetian wool guild, for example, contains statutory material spanning 1244–1595; the date 1244 refers to the beginning of the textual corpus edited from the guild's tradition and does not by itself date a surviving codex to that year.

The flagellant movement reached the Veneto in 1260. Although the usual flagellant processions are not documented in Venice itself, Santa Maria della Carità was founded in December 1260, and the confraternities of San Marco and San Giovanni Evangelista followed soon afterwards; these institutions later formed part of the group known as the scuole grandi. Their early statutes could be preserved by later copying, so an institution founded in the thirteenth century might be represented by a substantially later material mariegola.

Illuminated mariegole survive from the early fourteenth century onward. The form continued through the late Middle Ages and the early modern period, while individual books could remain in use for generations and be repeatedly supplemented or replaced.

== Institutions and contents ==
There was no single fixed internal structure for a mariegola. At its core, the book contained the normative texts by which a corporate body defined its organization and the conduct expected of its members. Depending on the institution, it might also preserve lists of members, inventories and other records of property, later resolutions and other material considered important to the body's corporate memory.

For confraternities, regulations combined institutional governance with religious and charitable obligations. Statutes could prescribe prayers, attendance at worship and processions, penitential practices, funeral observances for deceased members and forms of assistance to the poor. Venetian scuole supported hospices, distributed alms and provided housing or other relief, while their internal finances, membership and behaviour were also matters of public concern. Sixteenth-century confraternities of the Holy Sacrament, for example, combined devotional activity with poor relief and responsibilities connected with parish altars and church furnishings.

In some confraternities, admission itself made the relationship between the written statutes and collective practice explicit. At the Scuola di Sant'Orsola, new members knelt before the school's altar and promised obedience to the rules recorded in the mariegola before receiving the kiss of peace from the gastaldo.

Rules could also be revised in response to experience. In 1454 the Scuola di Sant'Orsola undertook to support twelve needy women and eight needy men, but the following year eligibility for such assistance was restricted to members who had participated in the school's obligations for five years. In 1502 the Scuola degli Albanesi explicitly judged the extensive cycle of prayers originally required from every member after the death of a fellow member to be impracticable; the chapter replaced this obligation with monetary contributions used to support regular masses for the living and deceased members of the confraternity.

The mariegole of craft and professional arti regulated economic as well as corporate life. Guild rules could govern apprenticeship, including the duration and conditions of training, admission to a trade and progression toward mastership. These rules varied between crafts and changed over time, so the provisions of one guild cannot be assumed to characterize all mariegole. Nor was the boundary between confraternity and corporation always fixed. The history of the Scuola di San Giovanni Battista in Santa Sofia, for instance, has been described as a transition from confraternity to corporation during the fourteenth and fifteenth centuries.

The surviving corpus also includes mariegole of some Venetian nations, corporate associations whose members shared a non-Venetian geographical origin.

== Manuscript form and revision ==
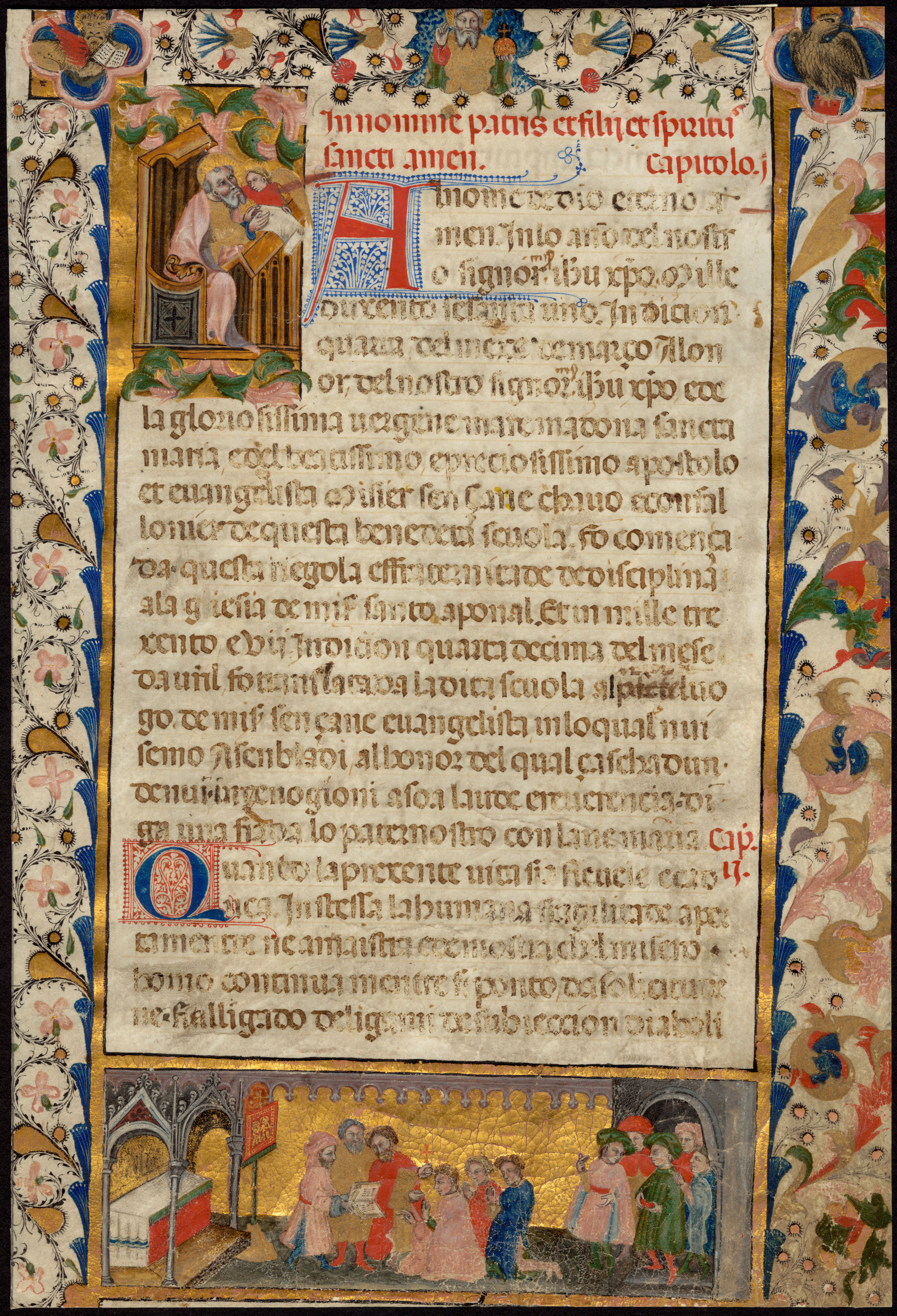
A leaf from a mariegola of the Scuola Grande di San Giovanni Evangelista, written in Venice c. 1418 – c. 1422.

Late medieval mariegole commonly took the form of bound manuscripts. In the illuminated corpus, texts were often written in the local vernacular in Gothic script, while elaborate frontispieces could employ strong colours, gold and figural imagery. Parchment was used for many richly decorated examples, including the 1518 illuminated page from the stonecutters' mariegola shown above, but neither parchment nor illumination was a defining requirement of the type. Surviving books also include manuscripts combining parchment and paper, as well as volumes whose principal significance is documentary rather than pictorial.

The language of mariegole was likewise not uniform. Mariegole survive in both Latin and the Venetian vernacular; in some traditions earlier Latin statutes coexist with later vernacular versions. The vernacular is prominent in much of the later corpus. A mariegola's history may therefore involve both textual transmission and changes to the physical codex, rather than a simple sequence of additions to a single unchanged book.

Many mariegole were cumulative manuscripts. New statutes, deliberations, confirmations and corrections could be entered after an original compilation; in other cases a body recopied its rules into a new book, producing successive redactions. The Scuola Grande di San Giovanni Evangelista provides an example: an early surviving mariegola was produced around 1320 and received additions in 1323–1330, while another redaction was compiled around 1355–1359 and augmented at least through 1366.

For confraternities, the physical book could have functions beyond preserving rules. Illuminated pages were used as aids to devotional contemplation, and images of Christ's Passion were closely related to the penitential practices of some scuole dei battuti. In solemn settings the bound mariegola could be handled or displayed as a ceremonial, quasi-liturgical object, making its decoration part of the institutional use of the book rather than merely an embellishment.

== Government oversight ==
A mariegola expressed the rules of a corporate body, but such rules operated within the legal and administrative structure of the Republic. There was no single procedure by which all mariegole were approved. The competent authority depended on the kind of institution and changed over time.

For guilds under its jurisdiction, the Giustizia Vecchia supervised corporate regulation, and guild statutes formally required confirmation before they acquired the force of public law. Guild regulations on apprenticeship were therefore shaped by interaction between corporate rule-making and state magistracies.

The major confraternities followed a different institutional path. The Council of Ten progressively extended its oversight of the scuole grandi, intervening in questions of membership, finance and conduct. In 1508 it asserted sole authority over them and required matters concerning the scuole to be handled through the Council. Oversight was later delegated to the Inquisitori e Revisori sopra le Scuole Grandi, which became a permanent body in 1627; from 1644 decisions voted by the scuole required its approval before taking effect. Supervision of the scuole piccole, initially claimed by the Council of Ten, was subsequently transferred to the Provveditori di Comun.

== Surviving examples ==
Detached leaves from the mariegole of the Scuola Grande di San Giovanni Evangelista, now held in different collections, have been connected with their original codices.

An illustrated bifolium from the Scuola Grande di San Marco in the Museo Correr (Cl. IV 83) shows Saint Mark enthroned blessing members of the confraternity on one side and the Flagellation of Christ on the other, bringing together the book's institutional and devotional meanings.

The mariegola of the Venetian stonecutters (tagiapiera), represented by the 1518 illuminated parchment page in the Museo Correr, provides a later example of a richly decorated craft statute book. The term was also used by other professional bodies: the mariegola of the Compagnia dei Corrieri della Serenissima Signoria, the Republic's company of couriers, survives in the State Archives of Venice and has been published in a modern documentary edition.

The illuminated manuscript tradition of the Scuola Grande di Santa Maria della Misericordia is dispersed: parts of its manuscripts became separated from their original books and entered different collections, a pattern also found with manuscripts from San Giovanni Evangelista.

== Suppression, dispersal and modern study ==
The fall of the Republic in 1797 did not bring all confraternities and their books to an end at a single moment. Successive governments intervened in the scuole, restricted their autonomy and confiscated their property. Under the Napoleonic Kingdom of Italy, remaining assets were seized on 25 April 1806, and a decree of 26 May 1807 suppressed many of the confraternities. Confraternities of the Holy Sacrament were exempted, and some continued into the nineteenth century.

The suppressions contributed to the dispersal of confraternal archives and works of art. Mariegole and individual illuminated leaves entered public archives, libraries, museums and private collections; some codices were broken up, leaving miniatures detached from their original statutory texts. Modern scholarship has therefore involved not only editing the texts but also reconstructing the provenance and former structure of dispersed manuscripts. A mariegola of the Misericordia and a detached leaf from the mariegola of San Giovanni Evangelista, both removed from the State Archives of Venice and later held by the Boston Public Library, were identified and returned to Italy.

Systematic cataloguing has made the surviving corpus more accessible. Barbara Vanin and Paolo Eleuteri's catalogue of the mariegole in the Museo Correr provides codicological descriptions and manuscript identifications, while Humphrey's studies have reconstructed the production, iconography and use of the illuminated corpus. MAR.VEN (Mariegole Veneziane) is a digital edition and annotation project devoted to selected Venetian craft statutes, providing a searchable corpus and thematic tools.
