= George Kastriotes =

George Kastriotes or Kastoriotes (Greek: Γεώργιος Καστριώτης/Καστοριώτης) was a high-rank officer (postelnic) of the Principality of Wallachia at the turn of the 17th to 18th century, commissioner under Prince Constantin Brâncoveanu.

He was a Greek from the city of Kastoria, Macedonia. He is best known as benefactor of schools in Kastoria and Palestine. In 1708 he deposited about 13,000 ducats at the mint of Venice (Zecca) requesting the Greek community of Venice (Scuola dei Greci) to pay the interest to the community of Kastoria for the support of a local school and teachers. In 1703 he sponsored the printing and publication in simple Greek of the “Orthodox dogmatic teaching” by Sevastos Kyminitis. He was also a benefactor of the Orthodox schools in Palestine. He paid the wages of laymen and clergy for the instruction of Greek and Arabic in Palestine.
