= Gianetto Cordegliaghi =

Italian painter

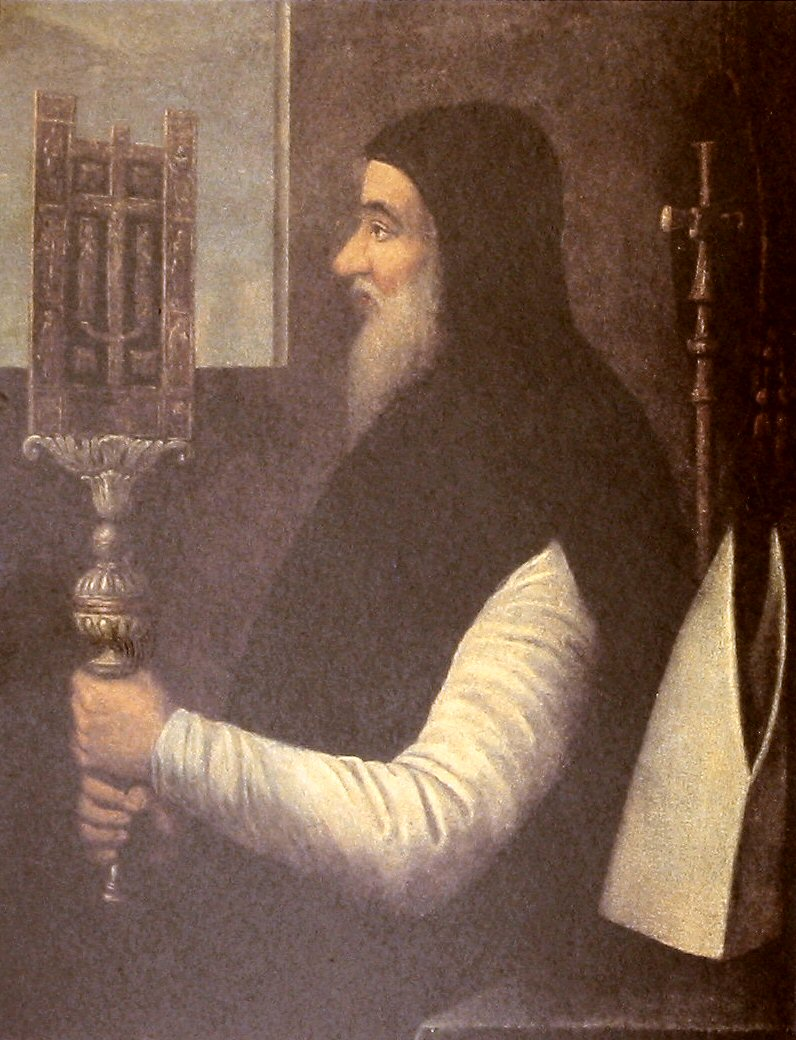
Portrait of Bessarion

Gianetto Cordegliaghi or Gianetto Cordella Aghi, also called il Cordella, (Early 16th century) was an Italian painter, active mainly in Venice.

He was a pupil of Giovanni Bellini.

He painted a portrait of Cardinal Bessarion and his Reliquary, commissioned by the Scuola di Santa Maria della Carita, and probably based on a lost work by Bellini, also commissioned by Ulisse Aliotti in 1472. The painting is now in the Gallerie dell'Accademia of Venice.

He died young.
