= Life of the Virgin (disambiguation) =

The Life of the Virgin is a name given to narrative scenes of the life of Mary in art, literature or music. Works with this title include:

- Life of the Virgin (Carpaccio), a 1504–1508 cycle of paintings
- Life of the Virgin (Dürer), an early 16th-century series of woodcuts
- Life of the Virgin (Goya), a 1774 cycle of murals
- Life of the Virgin (Filippo Lippi), a 1466–1469 cycle of frescoes
- Life of the Virgin (Lotto), a 1525 cycle of frescoes
- Life of the Virgin (Maximus), a possibly 7th-century biography

== See also ==
- Triptych with Scenes from the Life of the Virgin by Dieric Bouts
- Master of the Life of the Virgin, a Late Gothic painter active in Cologne
