= State Archives of Venice =

State archival institution in Venice, Italy

State Archives of Venice Archivio di Stato di Venezia
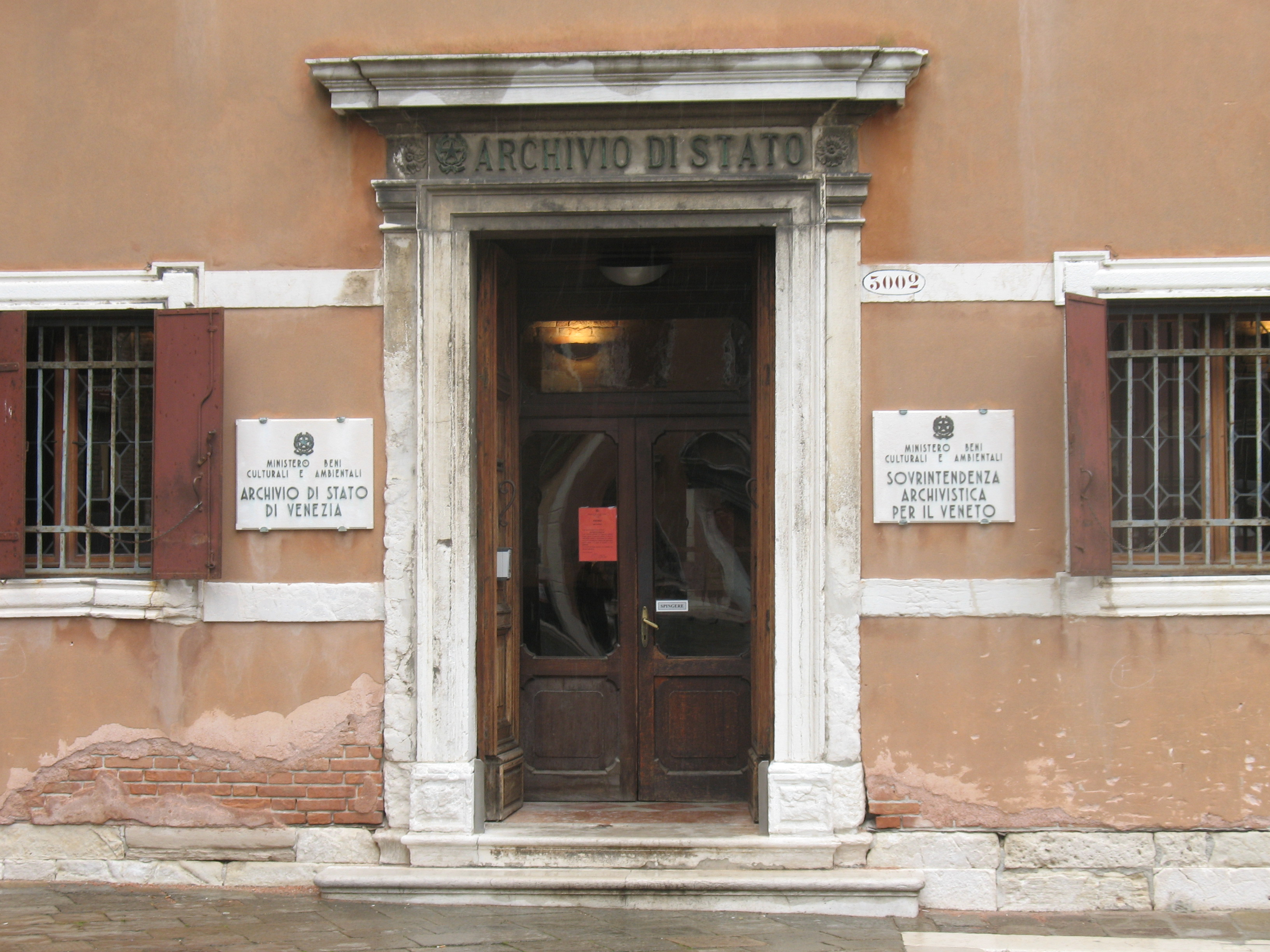
- Interactive map of State Archives of Venice; Archivio di Stato di Venezia
- 45°26′15″N 12°19′37″E
- Location: Venice, Italy
- Type: State archive
- Website: http://www.archiviodistatovenezia.it/

The State Archives of Venice (Italian: Archivio di Stato di Venezia) is the state archival institution in Venice, Italy. It preserves historical records produced by public offices and institutions in the metropolitan city as part of the national archival network administered by the Ministry of Culture. It is located at Campo dei Frari, in the sestiere of San Polo.

== Significance ==
The archive contains most of the historical sources that the Republic of Venice has had since the city fire of 976 (cf. Pietro IV. Candiano). up to 1797, as well as the holdings of Italian state offices based in Venice from 1866, which were ceded to the archive. The locally created archival materials from the French and Austrian periods between 1797 and 1866 are also located there. There are also isolated documents from before 976.

The more recent municipal holdings are in the Archivio storico del Comune di Venezia, while those of the parishes, the defunct dioceses and the patriarchate are in the Archivio storico del Patriarcato di Venezia.

Also in the state archive are numerous holdings from monasteries and churches, professional associations and families, the seven Scuole Grandi and the numerous Scuole piccole and the brotherhoods, notaries, etc. There is also a library with a stock of around 59,000 volumes.

Headquarters is a former Franciscan monastery at the Frari Church in the Sestiere of San Polo.

The house is not only the most important archive for Venetian history and that of Veneto, but also of the greatest importance for the entire area of the former colonial empire, i.e., the area between the upper Adriatic and Cyprus. The same applies to the history of the Mediterranean area touched by Venice's foreign relations, the Black Sea, but also the North Sea area and the southern German cities. It is also the most important archive for the history of the Balkans until well into the Ottoman period.

== History ==
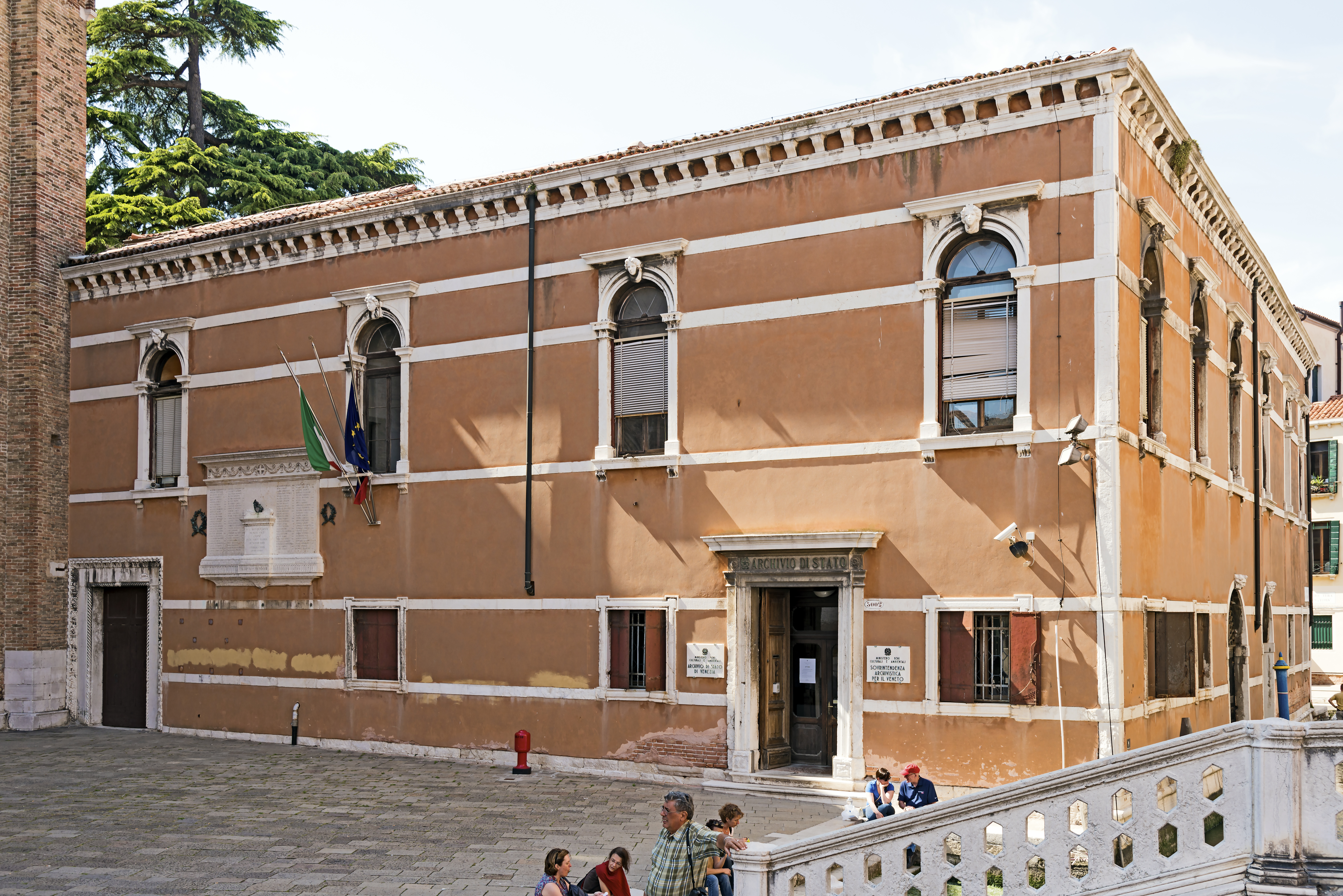
The archive with the entrance seen from the Frari Church

=== The Franciscan Monastery ===
The Franciscan monastery goes back to a donation from Doge Jacopo Tiepolo in 1246. The Order was permitted to drain the lacus Badovarius or Badovariorum. The small lake was named after the neighboring palace of the Badoer family. The number of monks and the amount of donations grew rapidly, so that on April 28, 1250, the foundation stone could be laid. One of the largest Franciscan churches in Europe was built by the end of the 15th century. Therefore, the double convent building was also called domus magna or cà granda. The outer, larger monastery was dedicated to the Trinity, the inner, smaller monastery to Sant'Antonio. The order was dissolved in 1810.

=== Beginnings ===
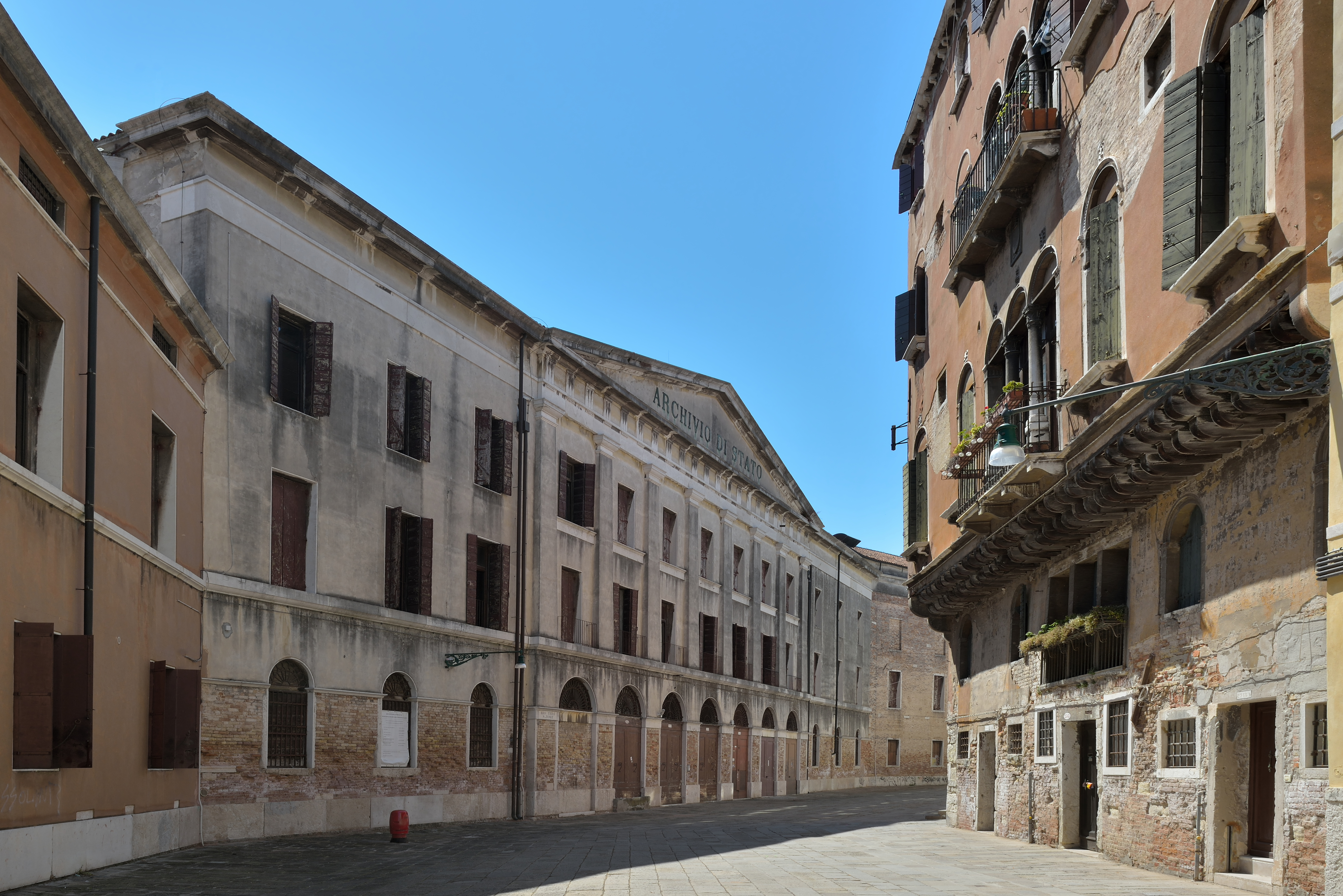
The side of the archive facing away from the Frarikirche with the Calle dietro l'archivio (meaning: 'alley behind the archive')

Jacopo Chiodo, who preferred the baptismal name Giacomo Chiodo, worked as an archivist both before and after 1797. He tried to initiate the establishment of a central archive, to which both Vienna and Paris agreed. However, it was not set up initially, instead there were still three departments in different locations: the "political" archives were kept in San Teodoro, a branch managed by Carlo Antonio Marin, while the court files were moved to San Giovanni and Archival documents of the Treasury and the Domains stored in San Provolo.

In 1815 Venice was returned to Austria, and in the same year the decision was made to set up a central archive. The state archive was created from 1817 under the name Archivio generale veneto, its first director was Chiodo, who retired in 1840. Actually, all archival material should be transferred to the current archive of the Austrians, but Chiodo managed to avert this. Between 1817 and 1822 the state files from the time of the Republic were brought there. In Napoleon's time, if they had not been taken to Paris and later to Vienna, they were spread over three locations. The state holdings from the period up to 1797 were originally located in the Doge's Palace, in the Procuratie or in the institutions at the Rialto Bridge. The files of the political organs were now in the Scuola grande di S. Teodoro, the court files were in San Zanipolo, while the economic files, especially those of the tax authorities, were in a palazzo near San Provolo. The notarial files were initially located at Rialto, but were relocated several times.

From 1797, French and Austrian authorities were in the city, and their holdings were transferred to the State Archives. The state institutions that arose in the city from 1866, when the city became part of Italy, also bequeathed their holdings to the archive, which was now the state archive. In 1875 the archive expanded and incorporated the former monastery of Ss. Trinità and S. Antonio beyond S. Nicoletto ai Frari. Therefore, the cul-de-sac behind the monastery is now called Calle dietro l'archivio, (transl. the alley behind the archive).

The archive was by no means open to the public for a long time. In 1825 Emmanuele Antonio Cicogna and in 1829 Leopold von Ranke had to ask the Emperor in Vienna for permission. At the same time, numerous documents and entire holdings migrated to Vienna or Milan. In 1805, a total of 44 crates first went across the Alps, only to be brought to Milan in 1815. They were not brought back to Venice until 1837 and 1842. The diplomatic dispute over the stocks continued for a long time.

=== Expansion after 1866 ===
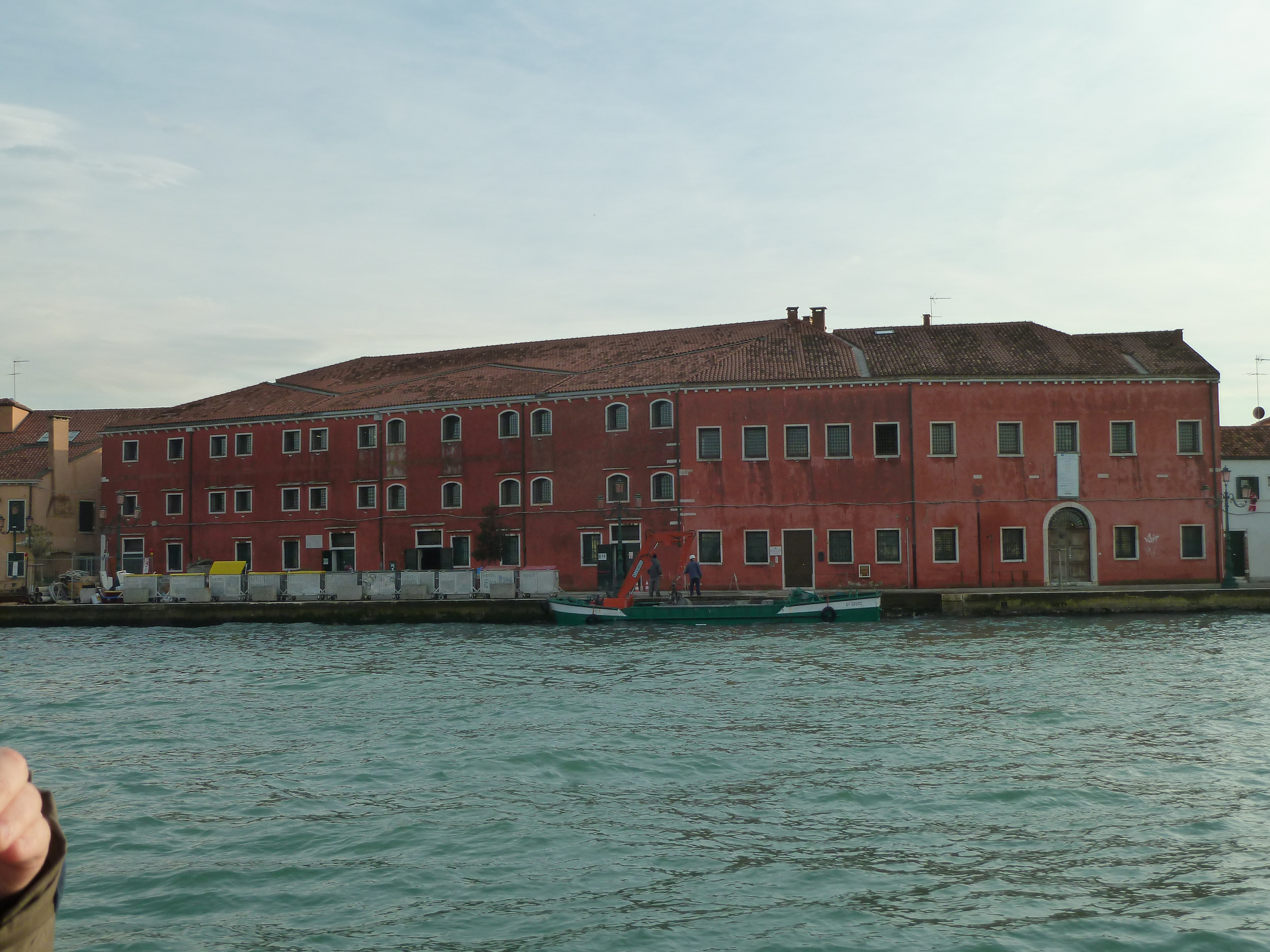
Branch of the State Archives on the Giudecca

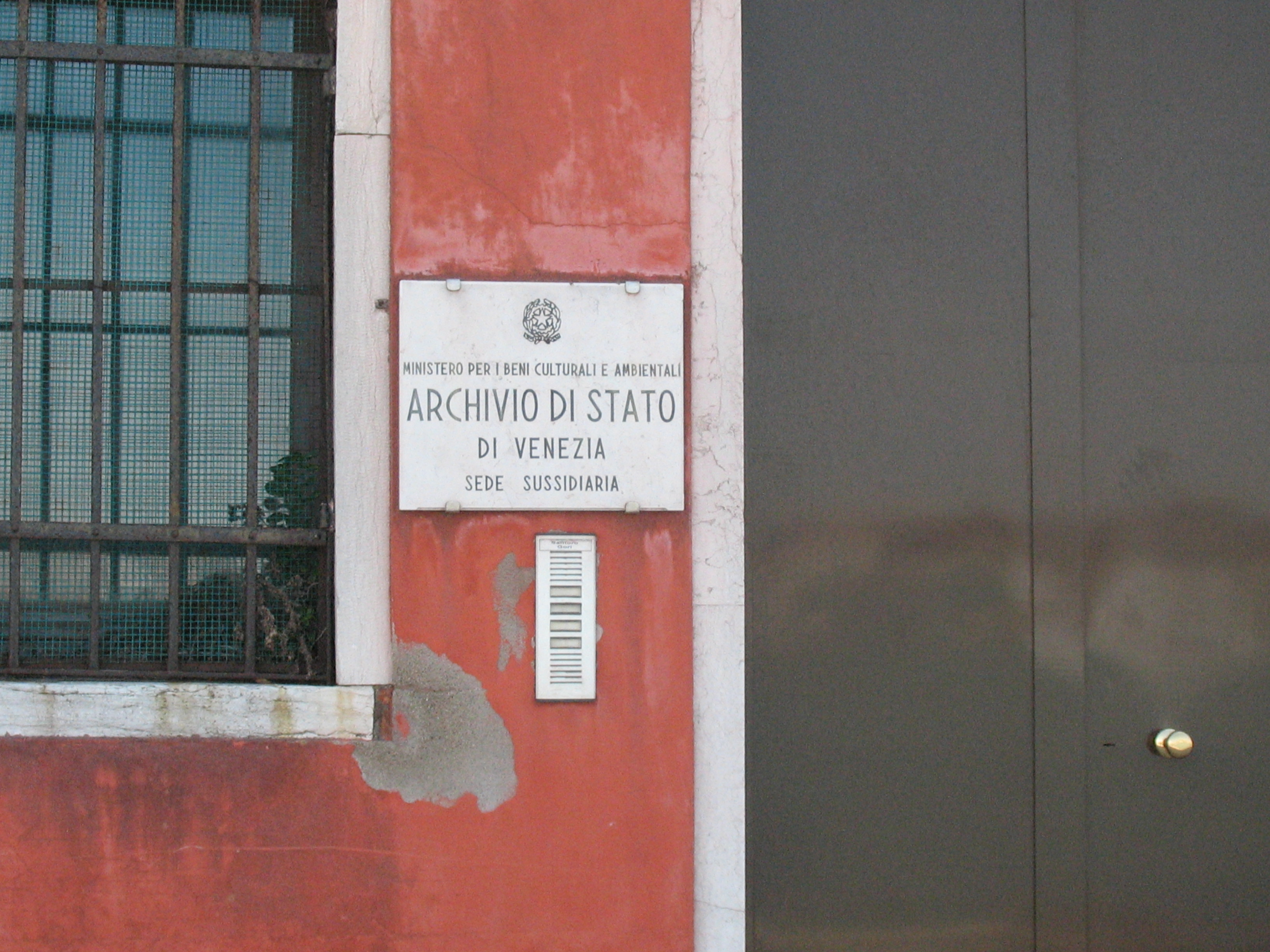
Sign at the entrance to the branch

In 1866 Venice became part of Italy. In 1876 the State Archives received part of the Palace of the Dieci savi alle decime in Rialto together with the adjoining Scuola dei Orefici. Directors were Girolamo Dandolo (1796–1867, director from 1860 to 1867), Tommaso Gar, Teodoro Toderini (until 1876) and Bartolomeo Cecchetti (1838–89, director from 1876 to 1889), Luigi Lanfranchi. Carlo Malagola was director of the Bologna State Archive, before took the director position in Venice Archive.

On November 4, 1966, the city experienced extreme flooding, which also endangered the archive holdings, which initially had to be placed on higher shelves. In the years that followed, protective measures were taken against future floods, and the convent of San Nicoletto was restructured. An enlarged reading room was created. In addition, the former summer refectory, which overlooks one of the two cloisters, was enlarged. That's where the financial files had been until then. Elements that had been installed at the beginning of the 20th century for structural reasons were removed during the conversion work, so that the room regained its original dimensions. The new reading room was opened in August 1989. At the same time, the main entrance was moved to Campo dei Frari. At the end of 2008, another flood threatened the security of the stocks.

The branch on the Giudecca (Fondamenta della Croce, 17) was originally a Benedictine convent. This became state property in 1806, used as a prison from 1811, then as a tobacco warehouse. In 1925 the State Archives exchanged some buildings on the Giudecca of the Magistrato alle Acque for the Palace of the Dieci savi alle decime in Rialto, which had served as a subsidiary until then. However, these spaces proved to be unsuitable, and so the archive acquired the former Benedictine building in the 1960s. Some items from the main building, above all the items concerning the Rialto Bridge, were recorded, subjected to conservation measures and transferred to the Giudecca at the end of the 1970s. In the 1980s, the state archives occupied the Benedictine church as well as the monastery. The dependence mainly contains court files, but also police, prefectural and financial files from the 19th century.

=== Principle of provenance, inventory records ===
Teodoro Toderini, director of the archive who fell ill at the end of 1875 and died in 1876, was an advocate of the principle of provenance, which ultimately prevailed, while his successor Bartolomeo Cecchetti took a different view.

Andrea Da Mosto (1937–1940), also director of the archive, published the first overview of the holdings, which is still useful today[5], and was followed by Raimondo Morozzo della Rocca (1905–1980, director from 1952 to 1968).

In 1994 a Guida generale was published, In 1997 the digital recording of the holdings began, which are to be gradually made available to the public via the Internet, albeit only partially. In December 2006, the Repertorio dei fondi e degli strumenti di ricerca was completed, which provides a general overview of the holdings. This is still not available online.

From 1977 to 1990 Maria Francesca Tiepolo was director of the archive, she was succeeded by Paolo Selmi († August 28, 2010) until 2003, followed by Raffaele Santoro until 2018, who in turn was followed by Stefania Piersanti.

== See also ==
- Ottoman Archive
- Dubrovnik Archive

== Literature ==
- Guida generale degli Archivi di Stato Italiani. Band 4: S – Z. Ministero per i beni culturali e ambientali – Ufficio centrale per i beni archivistici, Rom 1994, ISBN 88-7125-080-X, S. 869–881.
- Rawdon Brown: L’archivio di Venezia con riguardo speciale alla storia inglese (= Nuova Collezione di Opere Storiche. Band 4, ZDB-ID 2492330-8). G. Antonelli u. a., Venedig u. a. 1865, (Digitalisat).
- Bartolomeo Cecchetti: L’archivio di stato in Venezia negli anni 1876–1880. Naratovich, Venedig 1881. (Digitalisat)
- Maria Pia Pedani Fabris, Alessio Bombaci (Hrsg.): I „documenti turchi“ dell’Archivio di Stato di Venezia (= Pubblicazioni degli Archivi di Stato. Strumenti. Band 122). Ministero per i beni culturali e ambientali – Ufficio centrale per i beni archivistici, Rom 1994, ISBN 88-7125-090-7.
- Daniele Ceschin: L’Archivio dei Frari. In: Daniele Ceschin, Anna Scannapieco: L’Archivio dei Frari. La casa di Goldoni (= Novecento a Venezia. Band 5). Il poligrafo, Padua 2005, ISBN 88-7115-472-X, S. 11–48.
