= Life of the Virgin (Carpaccio) =

Cycle of paintings by Vittore Carpaccio

Life of the Virgin is a cycle of six large canvases by the Italian Renaissance painter Vittore Carpaccio, dating to between 1504 and 1508. Originally painted for the sala dell'Albergo in the Scuola di Santa Maria degli Albanesi in Venice, they are now split between several museums. They are mostly in oil, though some of them are in mixed technique.

== History ==
Whilst still working on paintings for the Scuola degli Schiavoni, Carpaccio was summoned by their rivals the Scuola degli Albanesi to produce a cycle on the Life of the Virgin, joint patron saint of their confraternity with saint Gall. The confraternity later passed to the Pistori (i.e. the bakers) but was suppressed in 1808 during the Napoleonic occupation and all its furnishings and paintings sold off and split up, including the Life of the Virgin cycle.

== List ==
Image	Year	Title	Measurements	Museum	Notes
	Unknown	Nativity	128×137 cm	Accademia Carrara, Bergamo	
	1505	Presentation in the Temple	130x137 cm	Pinacoteca di Brera, Milan	
	1505	Miracle of the Flowering Wand or Betrothal	130x140 cm	Pinacoteca di Brera, Milan	
	1504	Annunciation	130x140 cm	Galleria Giorgio Franchetti alla Ca' d'Oro, Venice	
	Unknown	Visitation	130x140 cm	Galleria Franchetti alla Ca' d'Oro, Venice	
	Unknown	Death	130x141 cm	Galleria Franchetti alla Ca' d'Oro, Venice	

In general, the inventiveness and colour consistency of this cycle are comparatively poor and this is due both to the more mediocre level of the collaborators and to the lesser commitment required by the brotherhood, but above all to the artist's difficulties in renewing himself in the face of the revolution triggered by Giorgione. Carpaccio's crisis, also visible in his last canvases for the Scuola degli Schiavoni, led to his isolation in the artistic context of the lagoon city, forcing him, in the following years, to work in the provinces, where his backward style still found admirers.

The main reason for the cycle's interest is to be found in the minute description of the details, some of which are of original freshness, in which one can often discern authentic fragments of Venetian life of the time, mixed with exotic elements and objects of pure fantasy. Typical of the painter's production are the insertion of symbolic animal figures that refer to the virtues of Mary.

== Bibliography ==
- (in Italian) Francesco Valcanover, Vittore Carpaccio, in AA. VV., Pittori del Rinascimento, Scala, Firenze 2007. ISBN 88-8117-099-X
- (in Italian) AA. VV., Brera, guida alla pinacoteca, Electa, Milano 2004. ISBN 978-88-370-2835-0
