= St. George and the Dragon (Carpaccio) =

Painting by Vittore Carpaccio

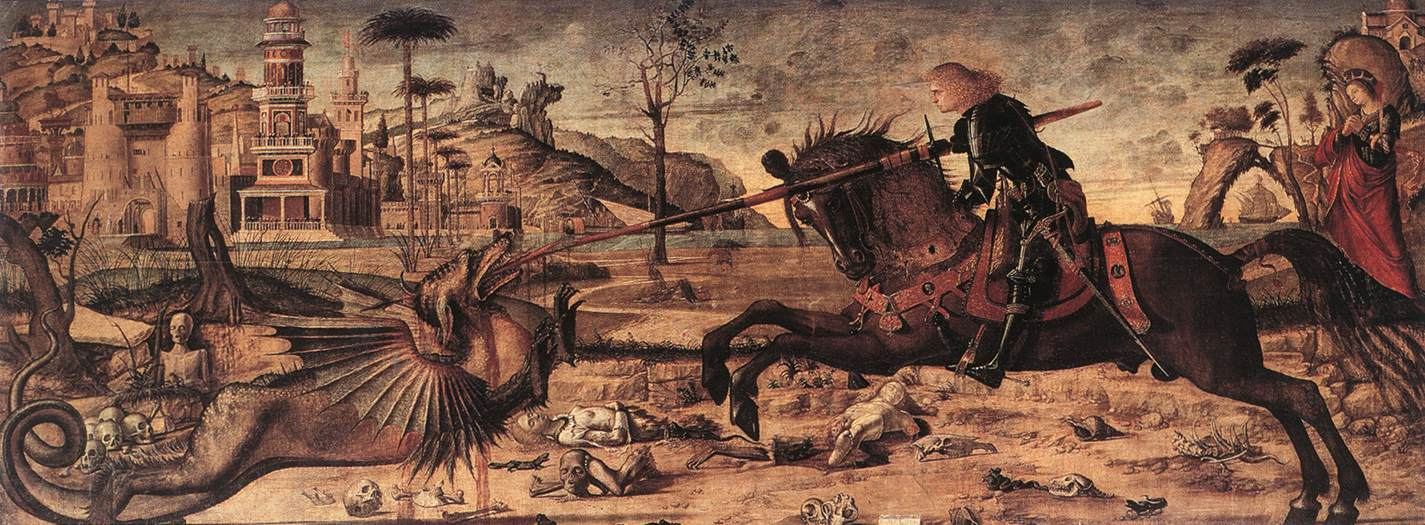
- Artist: Vittore Carpaccio
- Year: 1502
- Medium: Tempera on canvas
- Dimensions: 141 cm × 360 cm (56 in × 140 in)
- Location: Scuola di San Giorgio degli Schiavoni; Venice

St. George and the Dragon is a tempera on canvas painting by the Italian Renaissance artist Vittore Carpaccio. It is housed in the Scuola di San Giorgio degli Schiavoni of Venice, northern Italy. This painting acts as a metaphor for the relationship between the Dalmatians and the Ottomans. It symbolizes the ambition to christianize foreign cultures, specifically Islamic cultures.

== Patronage ==
Vittore Carpaccio's Saint George and the Dragon was part of a painting cycle that was commissioned in 1502 by the Scuola di San Giorgio degli Schiavoni. The Schiavoni (meaning "Slavs" in the Venetian dialect and referred specifically to the Dalmatians from the Dalmatia region of modern day Croatia) commissioned the Scuola deli Cycle during the time of the Ottoman wars in Europe. They fought alongside Venetians in defense against the Turkish invasion. Scholars have proposed that Carpaccio's Saint George and the Dragon alluded to the hardships inflicted on the Dalmatians during these battles with the Ottomans.

The Schiavoni Cycle, consists of nine paintings total, and honors various feast days and saints, including: Corpus Domini, Saint Tryphon, Saint Jerome, and Saint George. Saint George and the Dragon is the sixth painting in the cycle, and the first painting out of three that was dedicated to Saint George. The painting cycle is still housed today in its originally-intended location of the Scuola di San Giorgio degli Schivoni in Venice, Italy.

== Historical significance of the subject ==
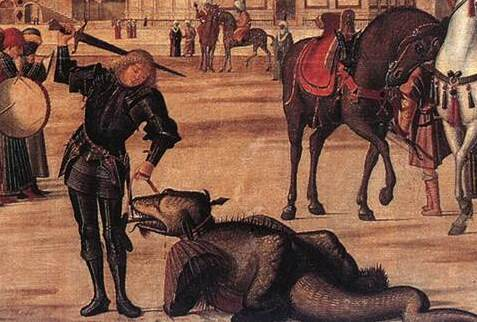
Close-up of the dragon submitting to George in Triumph of St. George, Carpaccio (1502)

The painting was commissioned to tell the story of how Saint George liberated the fictionalized pagan city of Silene, in Libya, from the deadly dragon. The scene of Saint George's lance piercing through the dragon's head symbolizes the victory of the Christian soldier defeating the infidel in this case Islam. This action lead to the conversion of the inhabitants of Silene. The thematic focus of the Christianization of infidels in the painting is further reinforced by the next painting in Carpaccio's cycle, The Triumph of St. George. In The Triumph of St. George (not illustrated here), the dragon is depicted not as slaughtered, but rather as tamed despite being fatally wounded in the previous scene, Saint George and the Dragon. This draws a clear parallel between the European idea of the civilization of peoples deemed less advanced and the submission of the dragon. Due to his efforts, it was argued that St. George re-established social order to the Christian kingdom.

In particular, the painting of Saint George and the Dragon shows St. George saving the princess of Silene who was going to be the dragon's next victim. As seen in the foreground of the painting, the dead bodies and appendages caused by the dragon were sacrificed citizens of Silene.

The three paintings of St. George convey a fairy tale element that may have been inspired by the medieval French romances traveling through Venice at the time. In the painting of St. George and the Dragon, St. George is portrayed as the classic trope of the knight who saves the princess. However, it should also be noted that this triumphant scene of St. George slaying a beast and rescuing maiden on horseback dates back prior to Christianity. Take, for example, the imagery of the Egyptian god Horus slaying the Egyptian symbol of chaos, a crocodile.

== Description ==
=== Foreground ===
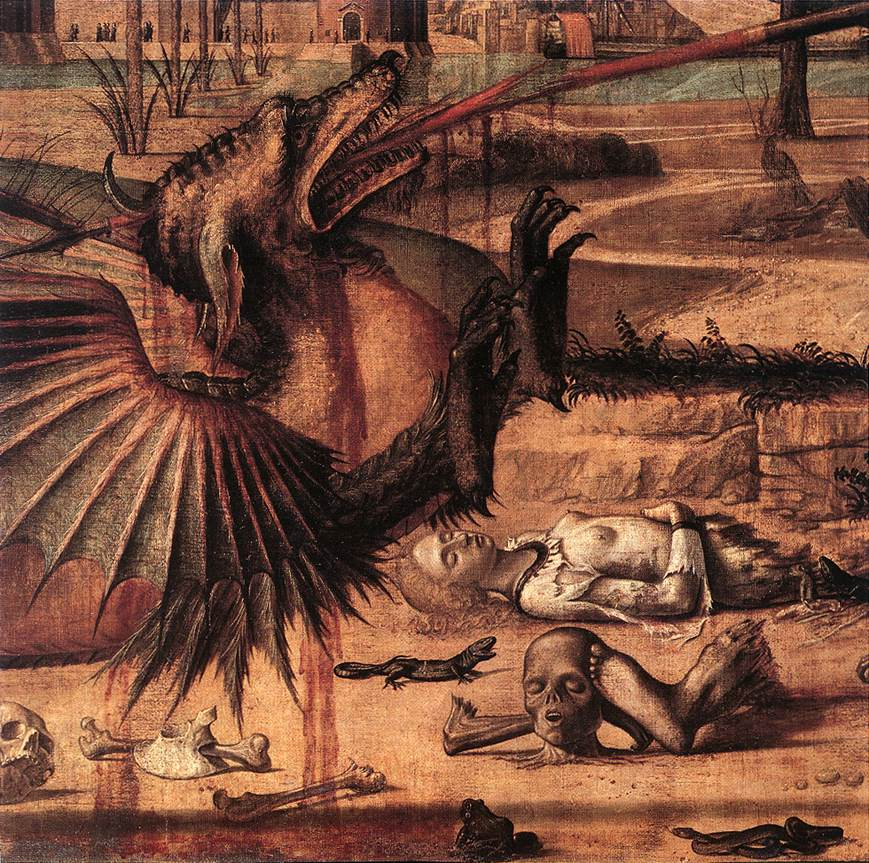
Detail of the dragon and of the macabre remains on the ground.

The foreground of the painting, which falls below the body of water seen in the painting, depicts St. George in shining, black armor on horseback with a lance piercing through the dragon's mouth and coming out through the back of its skull. St. George dominates the space in the right side of the painting. The arid terrain of a desert, with a few bunches of herbs, is covered with the remains of the dragon's victims: the scrawny stump of a woman, a half-devoured dress, a man with amputated limbs, a severed foot and arm, skulls and bones, both of animals and humans; this depiction of desolation and death is furthered supported by the inclusion of various lizards, snakes, and frogs scattered throughout the foreground. The only bright tones are those associated with George's metal armor, the horse's harness and the princess' dress. The princess, elevated from the ground by rocks in the right edge of the painting, serves as an antithesis to the gruesomeness of what lays on the floor beneath her. The crowned female figure, seen dressed in a red cloak to the right of St. George, has been described as a depiction of princess believed to be from the Empire of Trebizond, one of three pieces of the Byzantine Empire.

=== Middle ground ===
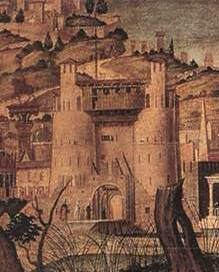
Close-up of Bab al-Futuh located in the upper left of the painting

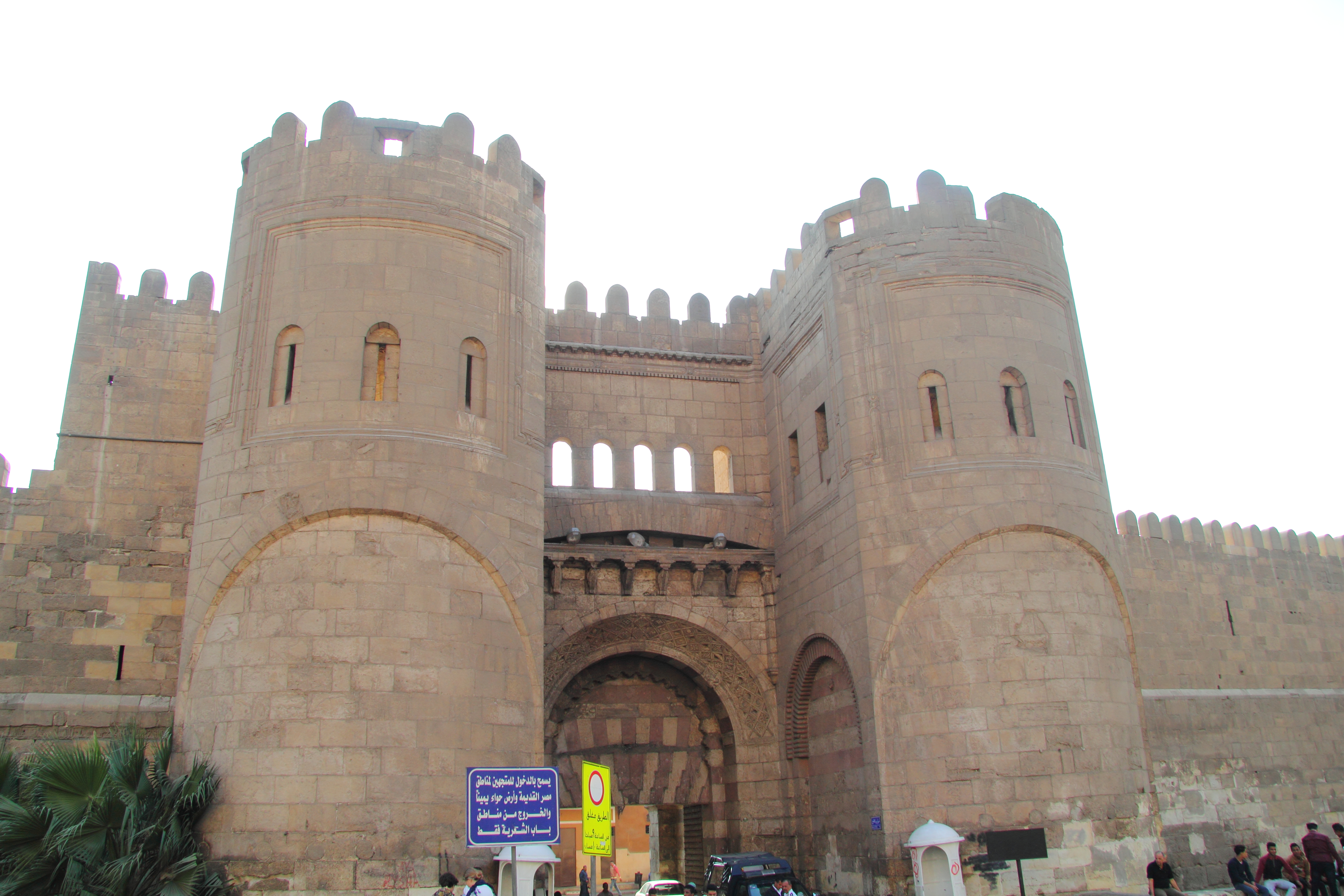
Bab al-Futuh in Cairo, Egypt

Just above the water on the left side of the painting, sits the fictional city Seline just past a bridge that symbolically connects civilization to nature. The bridge's main gates are modeled after the design of the Bab al-Futuh located in Cairo, Egypt. Carpaccio reinforces Egyptian character in the city with the addition of an obelisk, a monument style originating in Egypt.

=== Background ===
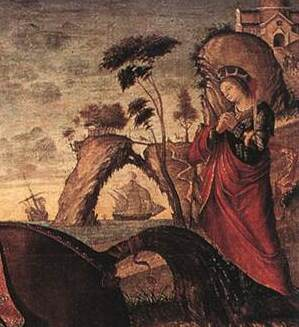
Detail of princess, rock arch, and Cathedral of San Cyriacus located in the upper right of the painting

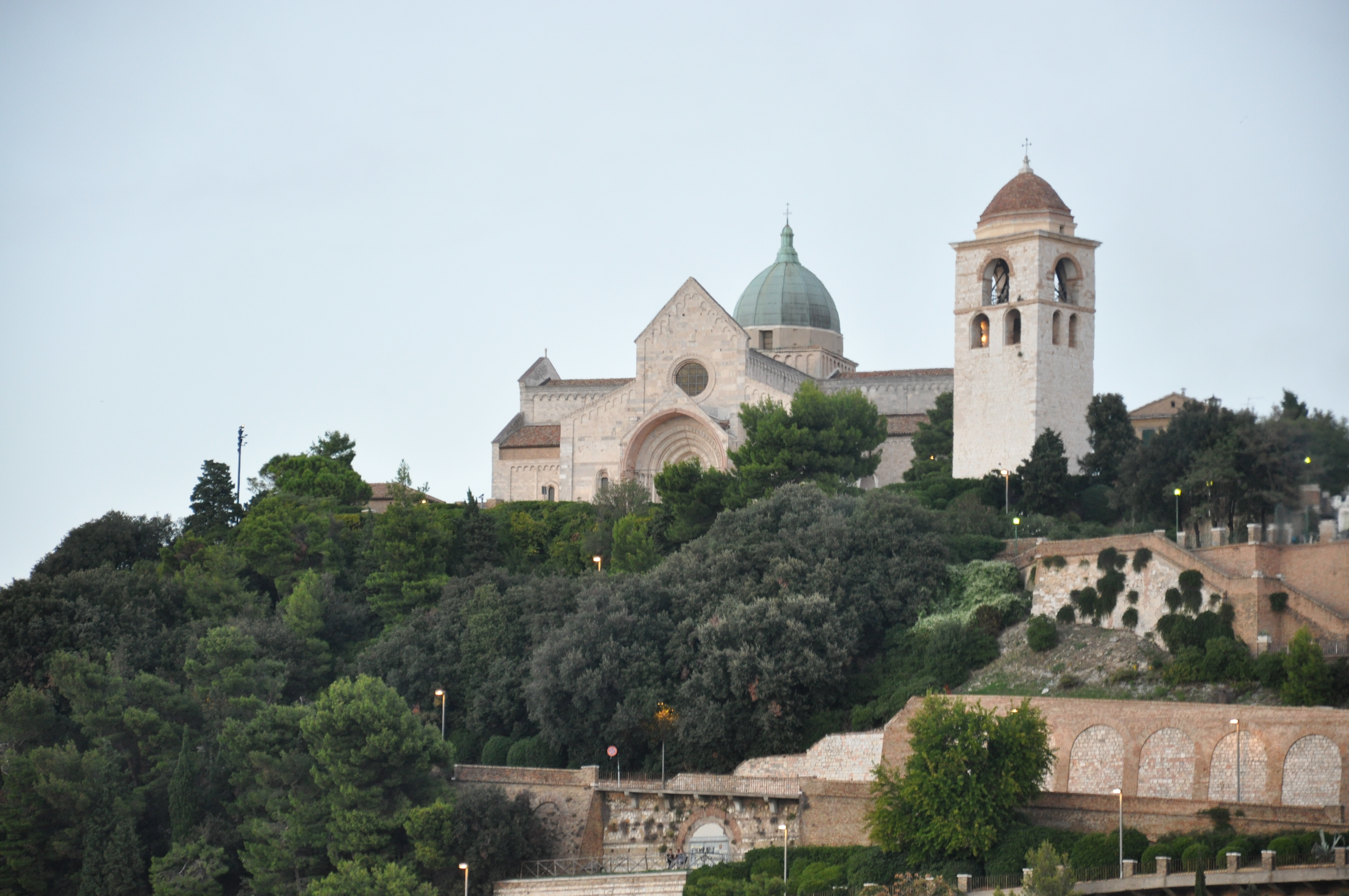
Detail: Cathedral of San Cyriacus in Ancona, Italy

The background of St. George and the Dragon includes mountains blurred from distance and a dusky sky. There appears to be an increasing amount of vegetation as the distance from the foreground increases.A castle can be seen at the highest peak of the mountains. Another example of the incorporation of real architecture of this can be seen in the upper right hand corner of the painting. Atop the hill sits the Cathedral of San Cyriacus in Ancona, Italy. The hills, featuring castles and rocky spurs, slope down to a harbor where there are two galleons, one being crowned by a natural rock arch.

== See also ==
- St. Augustine in His Study (Carpaccio)

== Sources ==
- Valcanover, Francesco (2007). "Vittore Carpaccio". Pittori del Rinascimento. Florence: Scala. ISBN 978-88-8117-099-9.
