= Scuola degli Albanesi =

Coordinates: 45°25′58.94″N 12°19′52.78″E

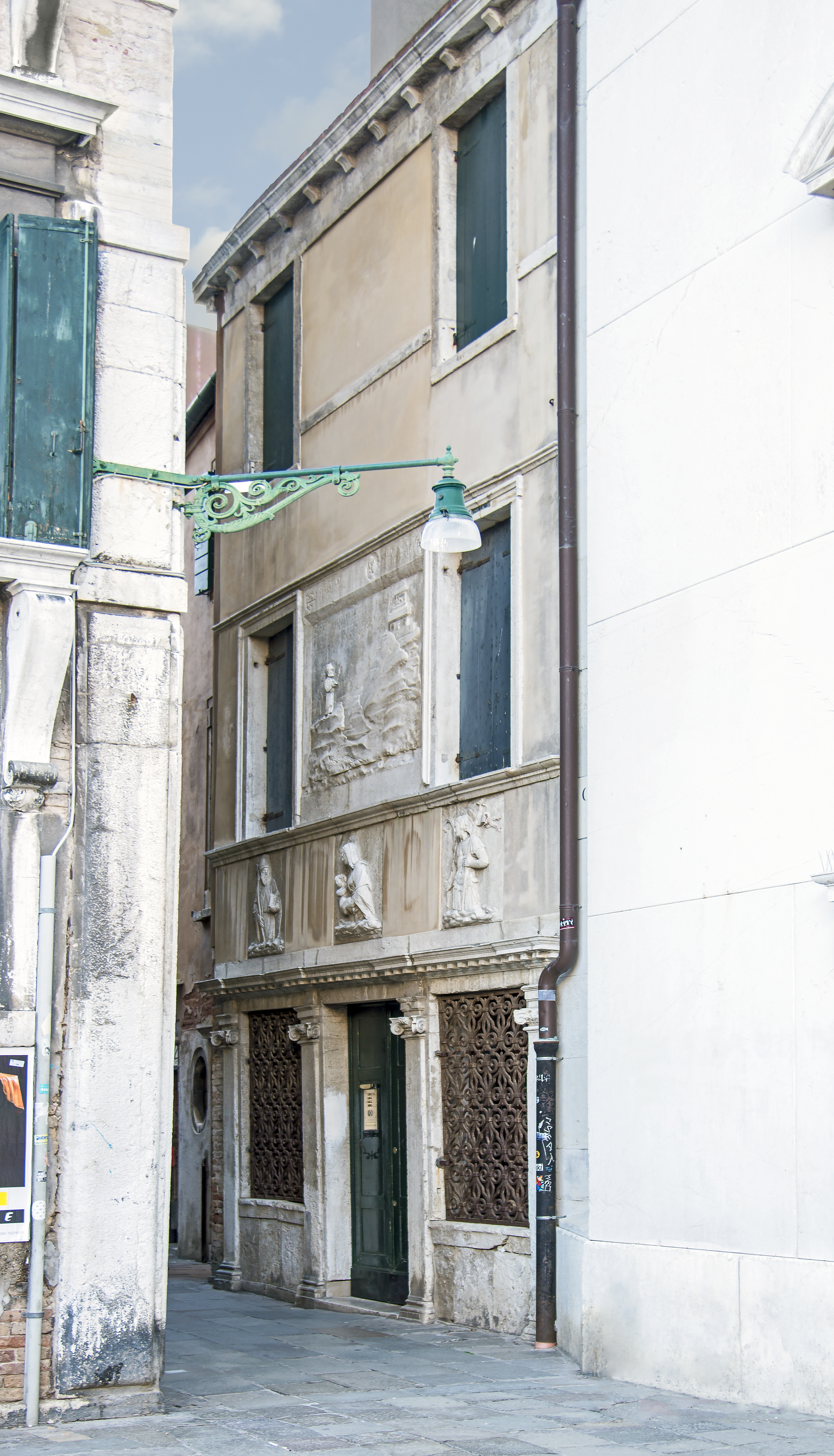
Scuola degli Albanesi

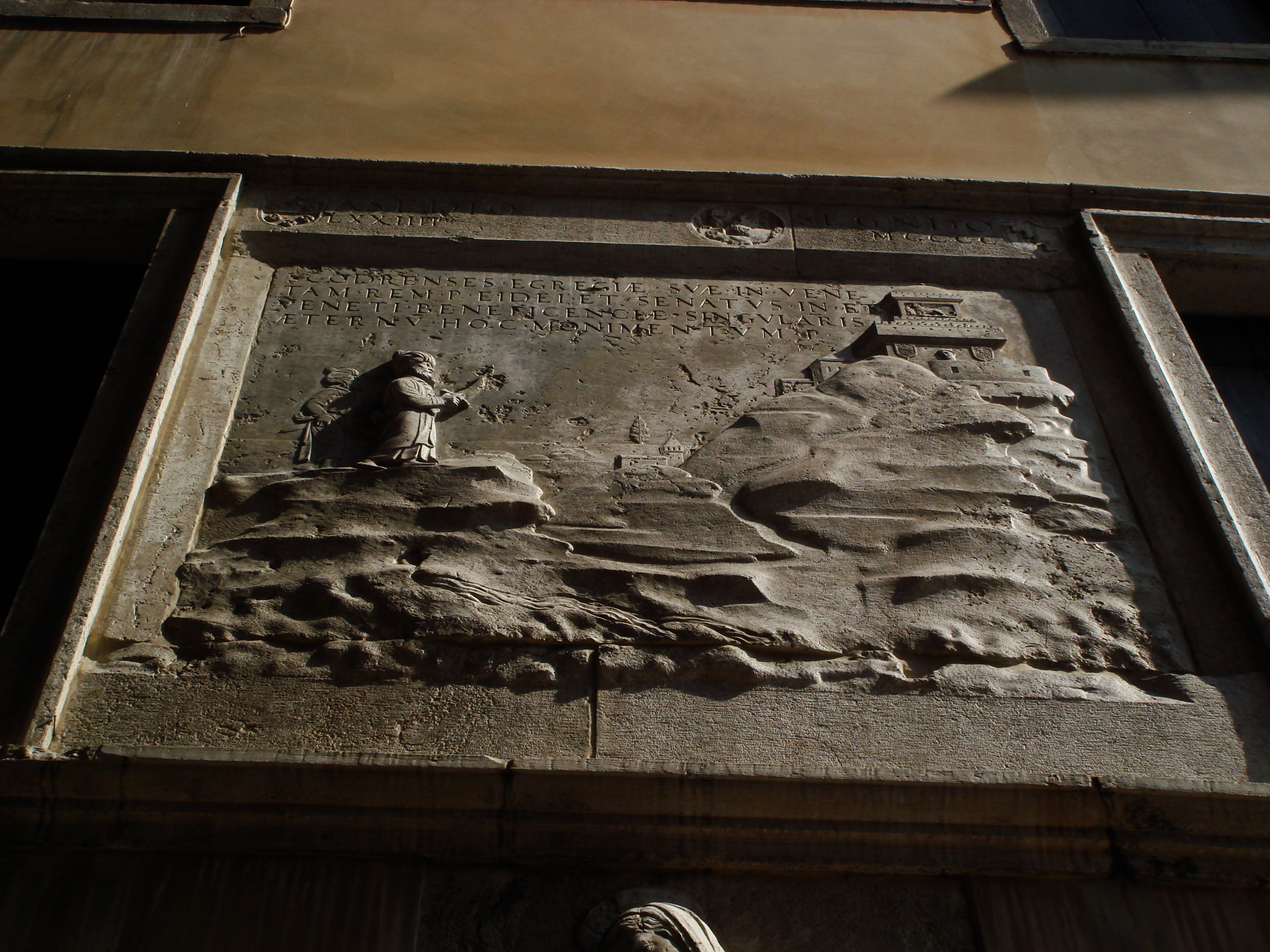
The facade of the former Scola degli Albanesi. It depicts the Ottoman sultan Mehmet II laying siege to the Albanian town of Scutari (then under Venetian rule). The siege failed and the Latin inscription thanks the Venetian government for its help.

The Scuola di Santa Maria degli Albanesi (School of Holy Mary of the Albanians in English; Shkolla e Shën Mërisë së Arbërorëvet in Albanian) was a confraternity, a Scuola Piccola, for Albanian Christians Catholics (Greek-Byzantine and Roman-Latin), in Venice, northern Italy. Its building subsists.

== History ==
It was established in 1442, as a brotherhood of immigrants from Albania and served as cultural and social center of Albanian Christians residing or visiting Venice till 19th century. Initially the members were meeting at S. Severe, where a monastery dedicated to S. Gallo (Saint Gall) had been founded in 810. St. Gallo was chosen as the Patron of the Scuola, together with the Madonna del Buon Consiglio, called by them "Our Lady of Scutari", the Protectress of Albania.

In 1447 the Scuola moved to the church of S. Maurizio, where they had an altar and a burial-place for their members. S. Maurizio also was venerated as the third patron of the Scuola. The original building of the S. Maurizio church was erected in 699 but was demolished. The present building of the Confraternity dates from the end of the 15th century. In 1531 the façade was decorated with the coats of arms of the Loredan and Da Lezze families, the heroes of the Scutari sieges of 1474 and 1479, alongside reliefs executed by the Lombardo brothers workshop. The latter depicts the Virgin and Child with Saints Gallo and Mauritius and the Sultan Mehmed II besieging the castle of Scutari (Shkodër), an allusion to when Albania was threatened by the advancing Ottoman Turks.

In 1504-1508 the main hall, the "Albergo", was decorated with a cycle of large canvases with the Stories of the Virgin by the Italian painter Vittore Carpaccio.

In 1780 the Scuola degli Albanesi was suppressed and building became home to the Scuola dei Pistori (bakers). In 1808 the scuola, and all the other Venetian confraternities, was closed by Napoleonic laws and its works of art dispersed. Today, the paintings by Carpaccio are scattered among museums in Venice, Milan and Bergamo.

== See also ==
- Siege of Shkodra
- Marin Barleti
- Bernardino Vitali
- Albanian culture
- Scuola dei Greci
