= St. Augustine in His Study (Carpaccio) =

Painting by Vittore Carpaccio

St. Augustine in His Studio
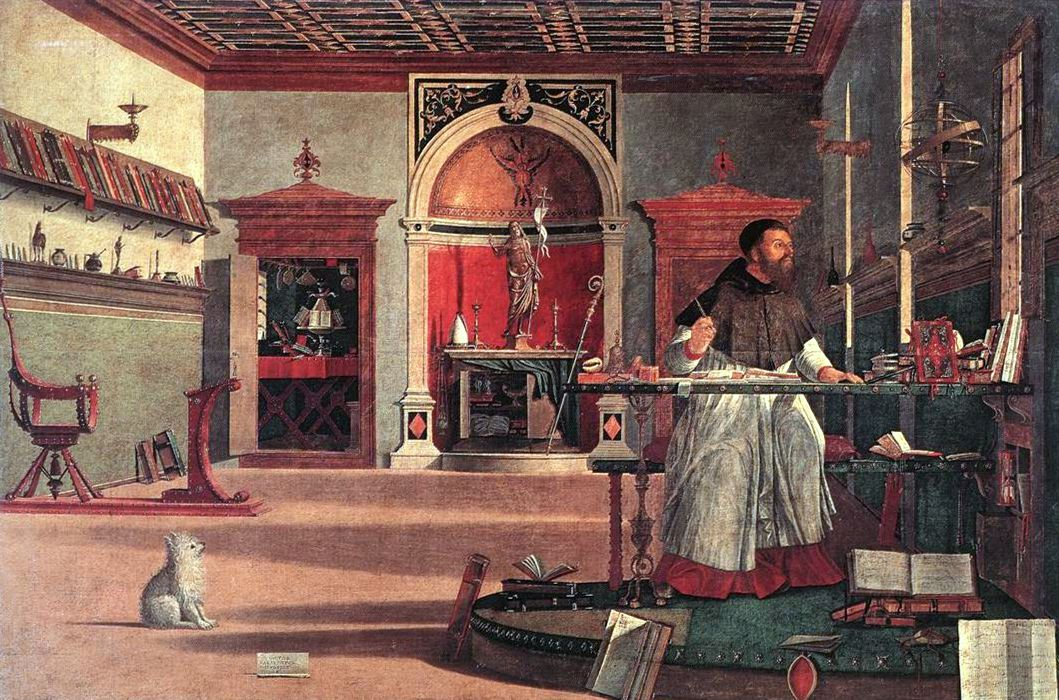
- Artist: Vittore Carpaccio
- Year: 1502
- Medium: Tempera on panel
- Dimensions: 141 cm × 210 cm (56 in × 83 in)
- Location: Scuola di San Giorgio degli Schiavoni, Venice

St. Augustine in His Study (also called Vision of St. Augustine) is an oil and tempera on canvas painting executed in 1502 by the Italian Renaissance artist Vittore Carpaccio, housed in the Scuola di San Giorgio degli Schiavoni in Venice, Italy. The painting depicts St. Augustine having a vision while writing a letter, sitting in a large room filled with objects. The study, or studiolo, was one way in which Italian aristocrats displayed their wealth, power, taste, and worldly knowledge. The study is spacious, the objects so arranged that each individually draws one's attention. The artist signed the work on the small piece of paper, or cartellino, depicted in the foreground near the dog that reads: "VICTOR / CARPATHIVS / FINGEBAT" ("Vittore Carpaccio was forming [this]").

== Subject and historical misidentification ==
This work was painted by Vittore Carpaccio for the Scuola di San Giorgio degli Schiavoni in 1502. Renaissance Venice had many confraternities, religious guilds or corporations, that functioned as charitable organizations. The Scuola di San Giorgio degli Schiavoni was founded in 1451 by a group of immigrants from the region of Dalmatia and known locally as the schiavoni ("Slavs"). Their confraternity was dedicated to St. George and St. Tryphon, and later St. Jerome. Vittore Carpaccio was commissioned to create a cycle of nine paintings that illustrate four separate narratives stories about the lives of Christ and Saints Jerome, George, and Tryphon. The majority of scholars agree that the entire cycle of paintings was begun in 1502 and was complete by 1507.

The painting of St. Augustine in his Study is a one of three canvases that narrate important scenes from the life of St.Jerome (c. 342–420 CE), who was born in Stridon, a province of Dalmatia and one of the Catholic Church Fathers. For centuries, the painting was mistakenly thought to be an image of St. Jerome, until 1959, when Helen Roberts connected the imagery of the scene to a legend based on a set of three late thirteenth-century apocryphal letters written by St Augustine (354–430 CE), who was St. Jerome's younger contemporary. The alleged letter was said to be written by St. Augustine, in which he narrates a moment when he was sitting in a study writing a letter to St. Jerome and was interrupted with vision. These letters of St. Augustine were inserted into several manuscripts and printed books that were dedicated to the life of St. Jerome and therefore became entwined with his story.

== Description, imagery, and symbolism ==
=== St. Augustine and the vision ===
In this image St. Augustine is sitting at his desk writing a letter to his contemporary St. Jerome, a divine also known for his intellect. In his original letter, St. Augustine recounts that while he was in his study, in the city of Hippo, he had been contemplating a treatise on the "glory of blessed souls who rejoice with Christ." He then began to write a letter to St. Jerome about it when he was suddenly bathed in divine light accompanied by an indescribable aroma. Simultaneously the voice of St. Jerome, who had just died in Bethlehem, filled the room, chastising St. Augustine for his intellectual pride.

This moment the painting depicts is that of St. Augustine seated at his desk, pen raised, peering at the window from which miraculous light pours, which was "not seen in our times, and hardly to be described in our poor language." This light is marked through the long shadows it casts across the floor and the mesmerized, attentive expressions of both St. Augustine and his dog, who sits on the floor.

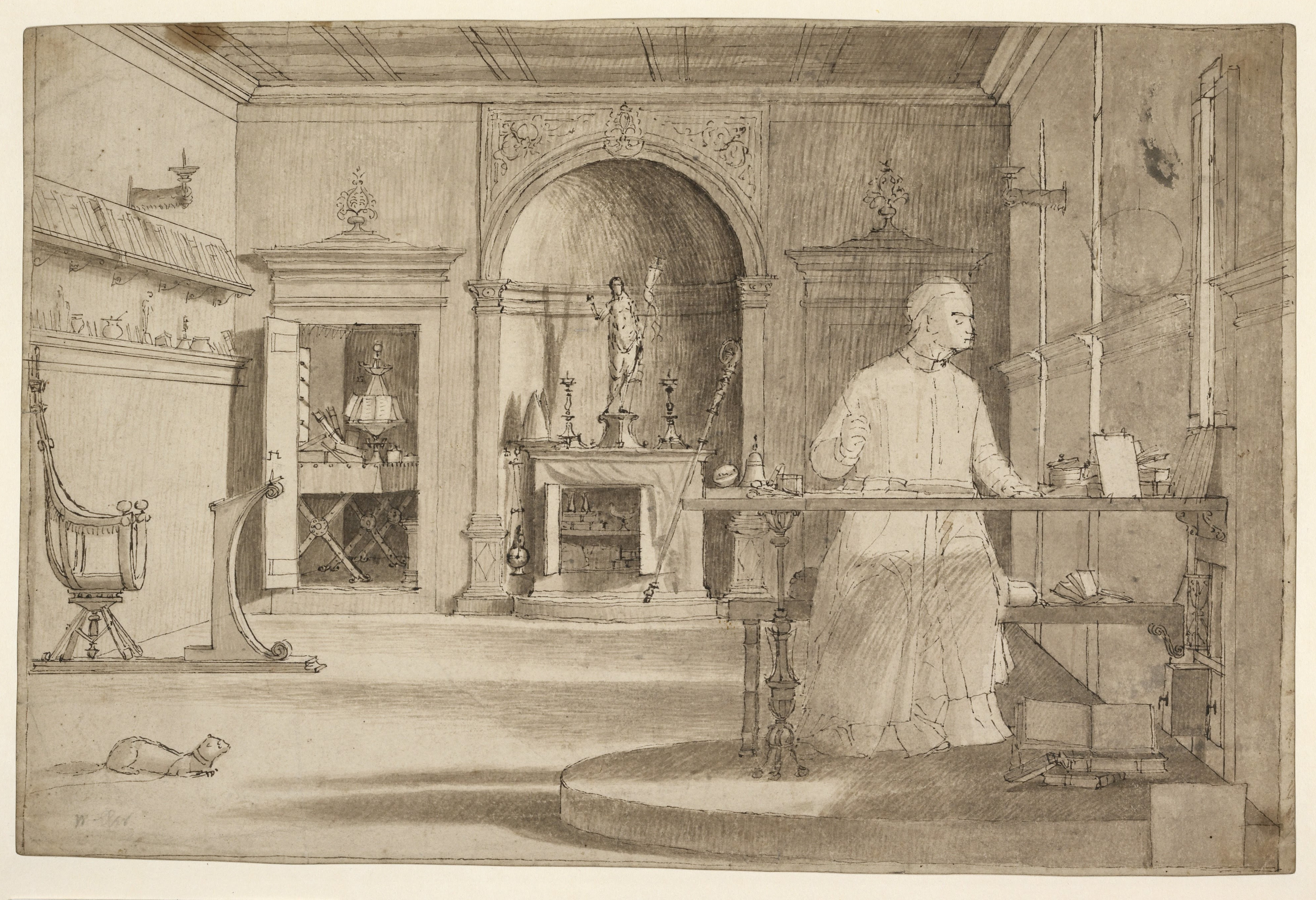
Preparatory sketch held by the British Museum, in which the dog is substituted with a different animal, perhaps a weasel or ermine.

A finished preparatory drawing of this painting, made on paper with pen around 1501-1508, survives at the British Museum in London. The detailed drawing that Carpaccio made highlights the setting and the use of light; the figure of St. Augustine is more sketched. The most striking, albeit minor difference, between the drawing and the finished painting is that the latter has a dog, whereas the drawing itself (as well as the underdrawing detected by infrared reflectography) was planned with some other small animal in mind perhaps a cat, weasel or ermine.

The light evenly illuminates many of the objects which are exhibited throughout St. Augustine's study.

=== The study ===
St. Augustine is pictured sitting in his Italian studiolo, or a study that is a private cabinet or room. These studies, also known as kunstkammer, wunderkammer or cabinets of curiosities, were typically used to display collector's items, and became popular in Italy in the fifteenth and sixteenth centuries. Aristocratic families collected items to exhibit their wealth, power, taste, and worldly knowledge, while others such as merchants and humanists collected items to show sophistication and business success. The study is a significant part of the painting's subject, catching the viewer's attention immediately and highlighting St. Augustine as a humanist scholar who was an intelligent, knowledgeable, and pious man. Numerous books lining the bookshelves display St. Augustine's intelligence, as do various objects around the room such as an astrolabe, figurines, a conch shell, furniture, and other ornaments. Other items in the study symbolize St. Augustine's Christian piety, such as the mitre, crook, and statue of the Resurrection of Christ, seen in the small niche with the altar located in the center of the back of the study.

The objects presented were painted based on models and studio props from Islamic, Western, and Italian origin, such as a bronze pacing horse statue, a sculpture of Venus, and the statue of the resurrected Christ. Each one of these objects is distinguished by its own shape, texture, and pop of color in the painting, yet no one object is unequally emphasized. This provides a cataloging effect for these objects, many with symbolic meanings, and reinforces St. Augustine's ownership of them.

=== Objects in the study ===
Many of the objects in the study would usually go unnoticed; however, Vittore Carpaccio chose to display the cabinet in the back left of the painting with the doors wide open and the shelf under the altarpiece with the curtain pulled back in order to allow the viewer to see more in depth into the life of St. Augustine. The door has a lock and key in it to reflect contemporary practices of locking up books since they were considered sacred books. Many other objects are carefully positioned around the study in order to display the collection of St. Augustine. Scholars have argued that the impressive variety of items from the arts, sciences, astronomy, and theology, drawn from different places and historical times, symbolizes the active, intellectual mind of St. Augustine.

Some of the notable objects include:

- On and around St. Augustine's desk, a conch shell, bell, pair of scissors, a tin Mamluk Sultanate vessel (referred to as an "instagnada" in Renaissance inventories), a variety of books and musical manuscripts, and an armillary sphere.
- An attentive white Volpino Italiano, which is similar to a German Spitz
- An Italian Renaissance bronze replica one of the Horses of San Marco Basilica (situated on the left bookshelf, it is similar to a statuette of a pacing horse made in Venice in the sixteenth century which can be seen at the Ashmolean Museum in Oxford).
- Also on the bookshelf on the far left is an early sixteenth-century bronze version of Venus (now at the Victoria and Albert Museum in London) by Pier Jacopo Alari Bonacolsi. The inclusion of the statue of Venus may symbolize the coming of good fortune.
- A Mamluk candlestick, a similar early fourteenth-century one can found at the Metropolitan Museum of Art.
- Three astrolabes and a quadrant in the small alcove in the left corner.
Details

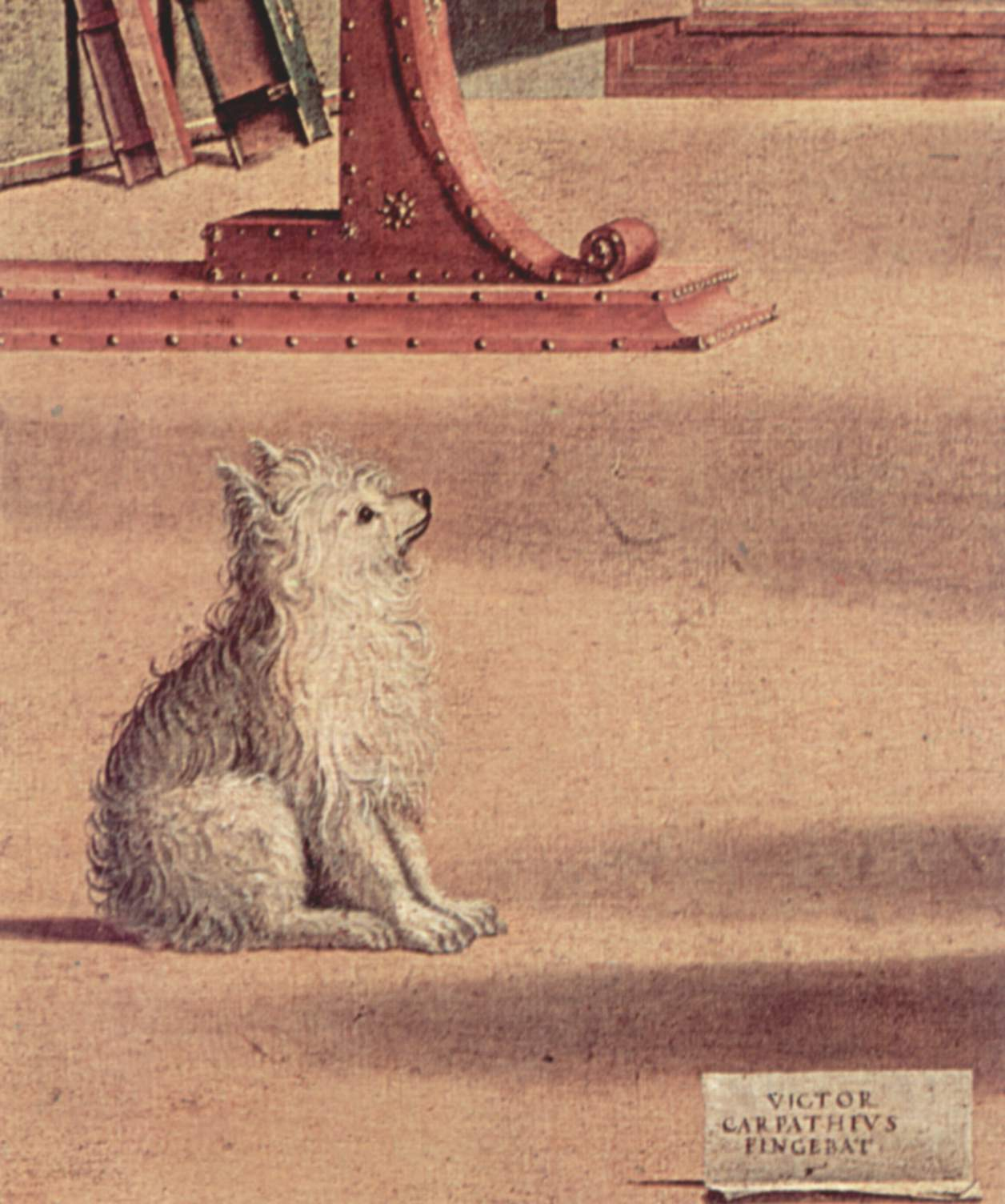
In the center of the room is a German Spitz dog

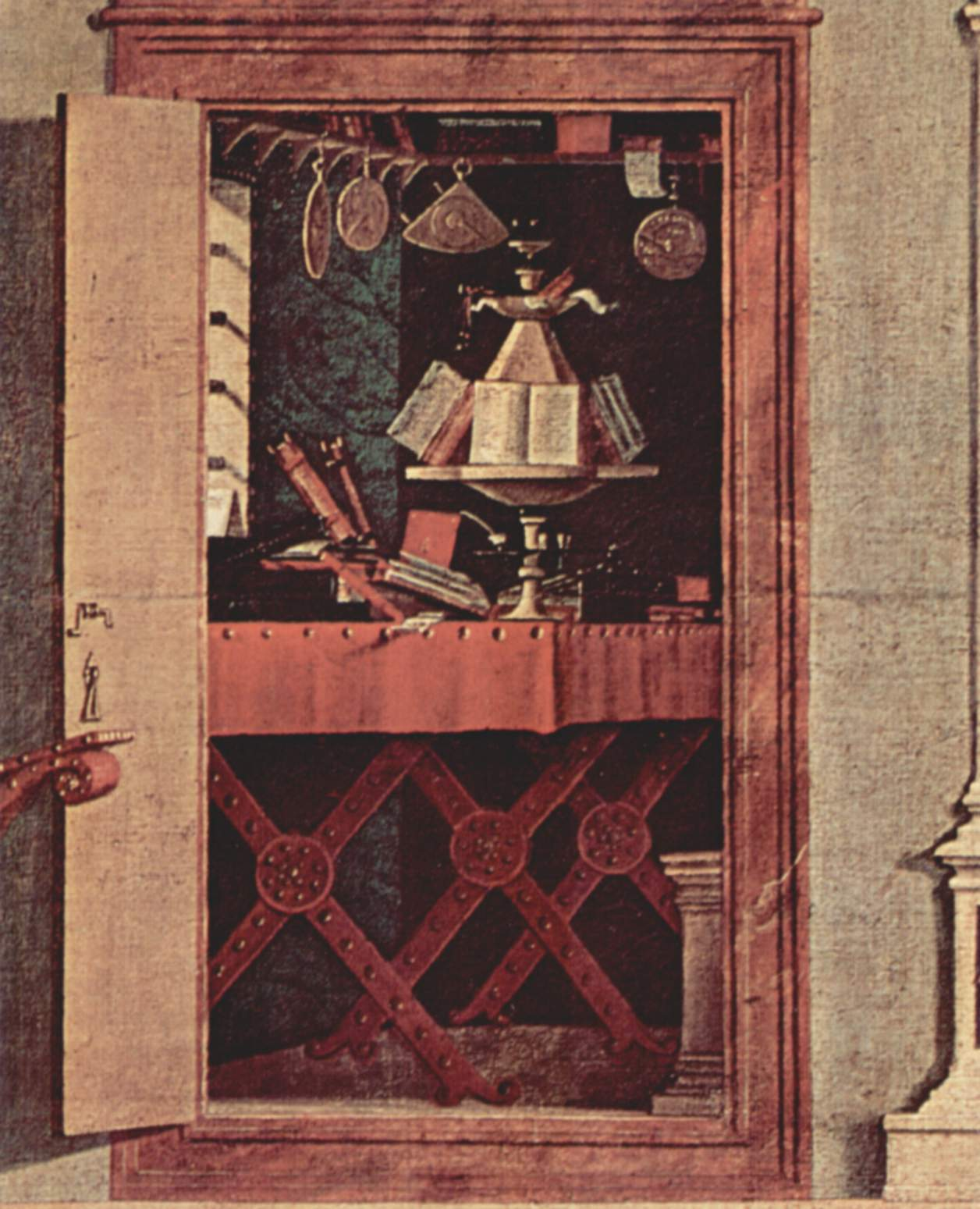

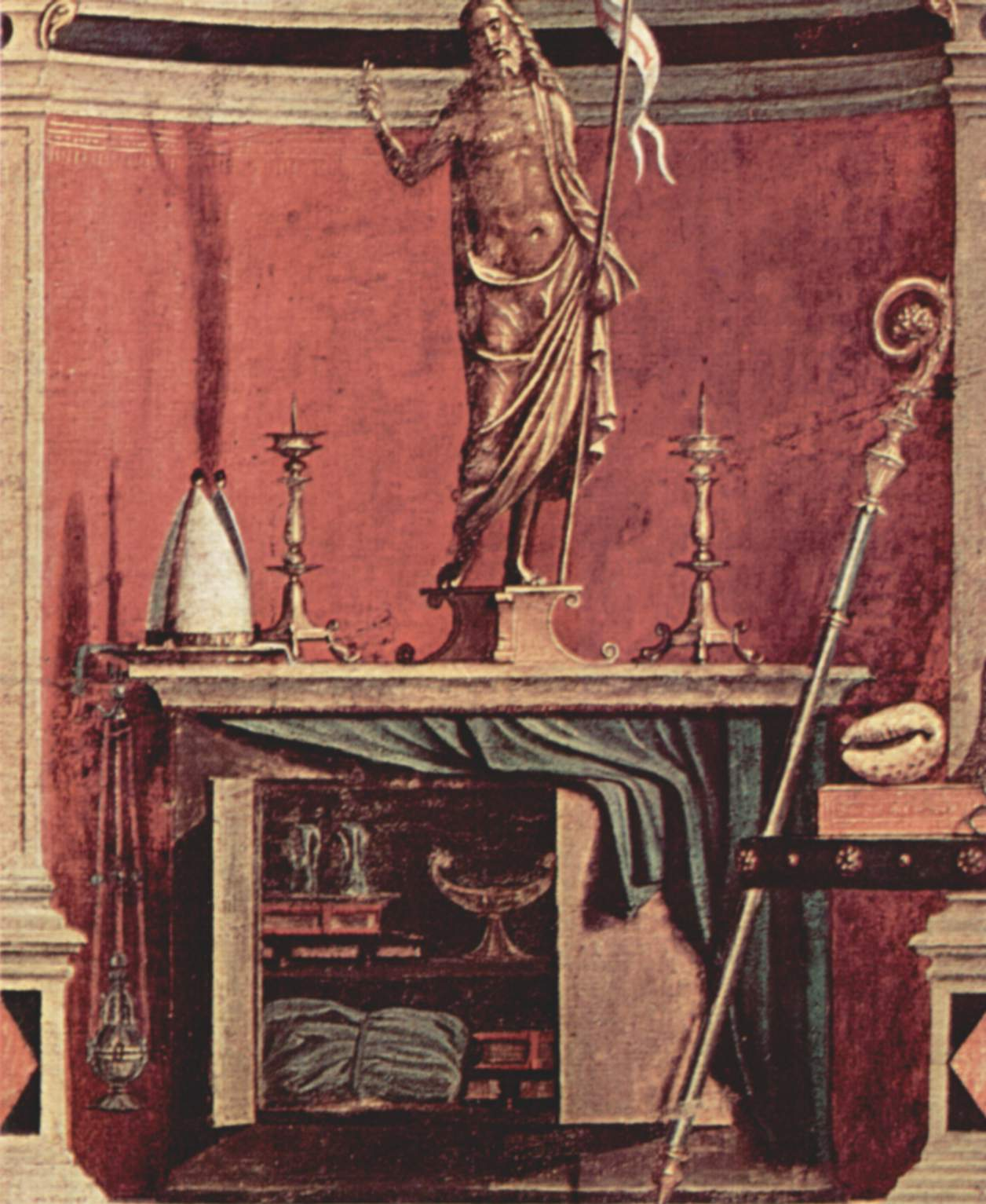
The altar

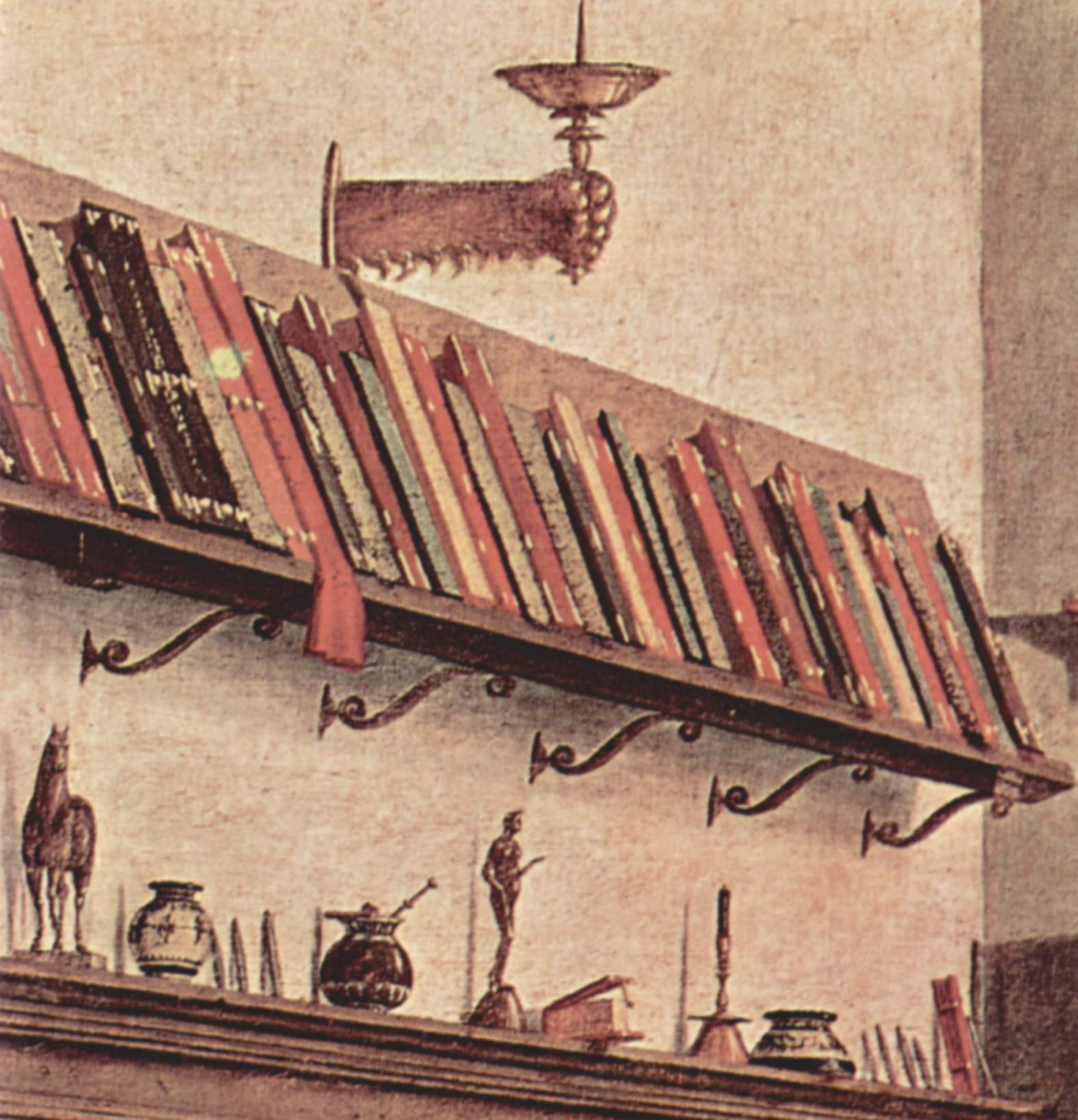
A bookshelf

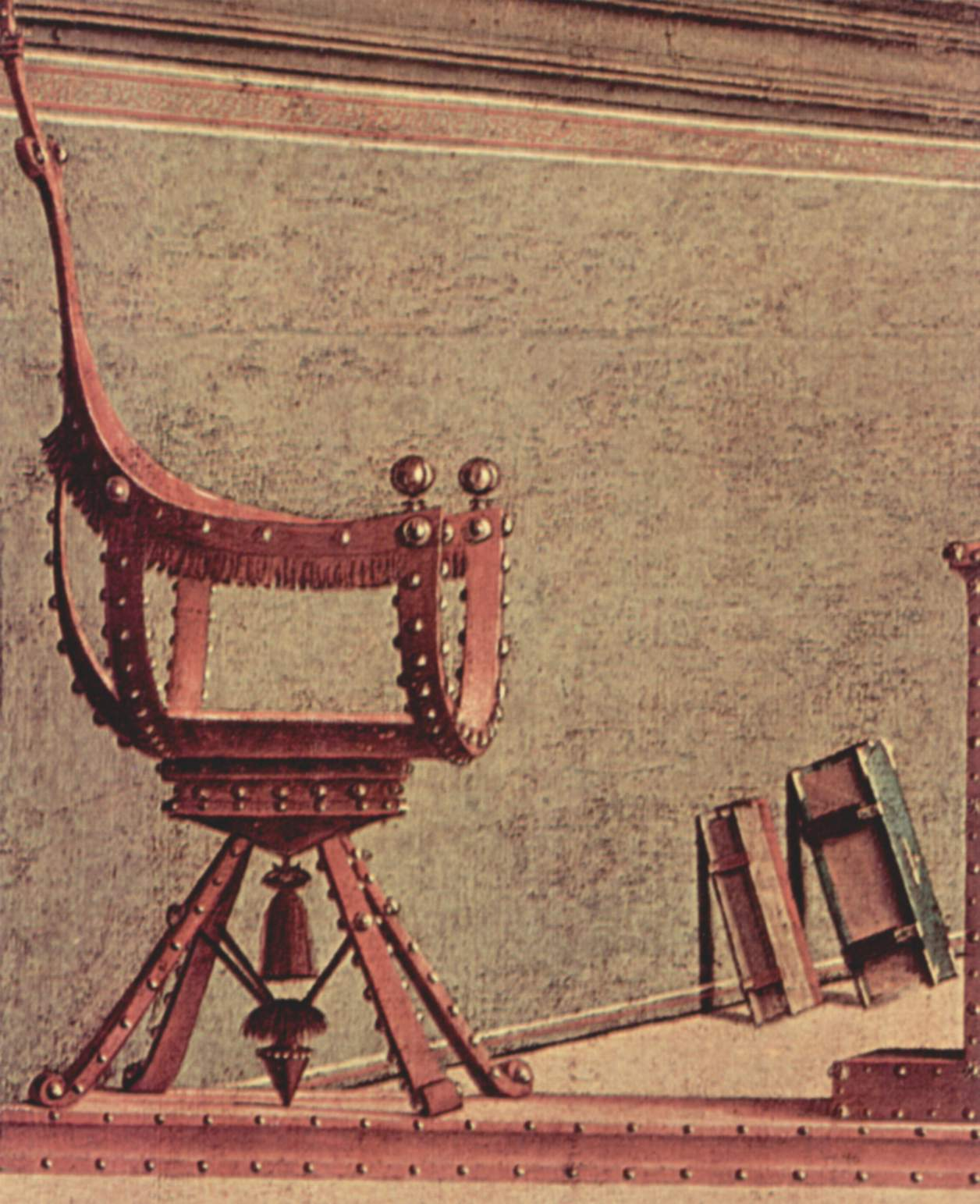
An ornate chair

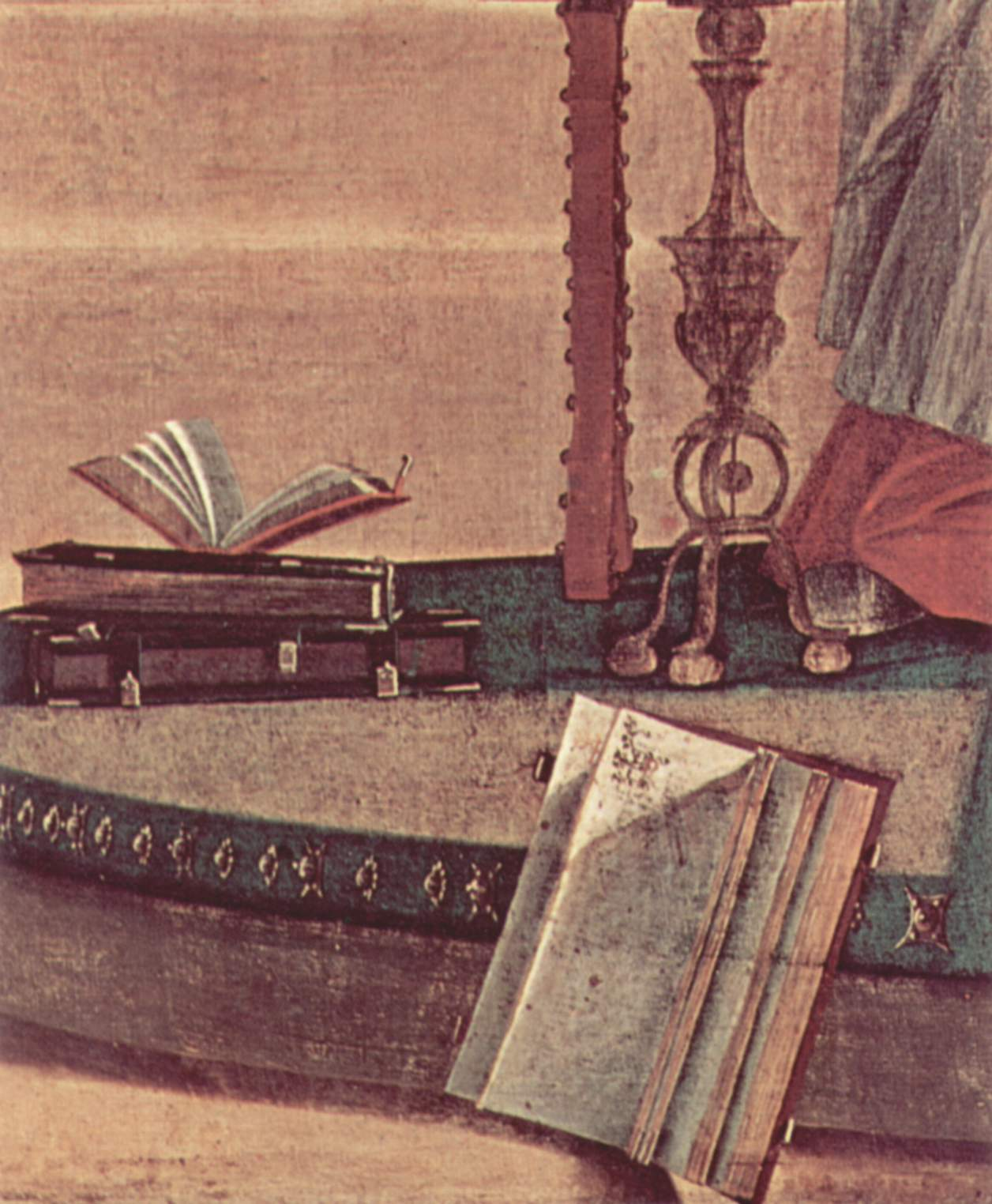
La pedana (platform)

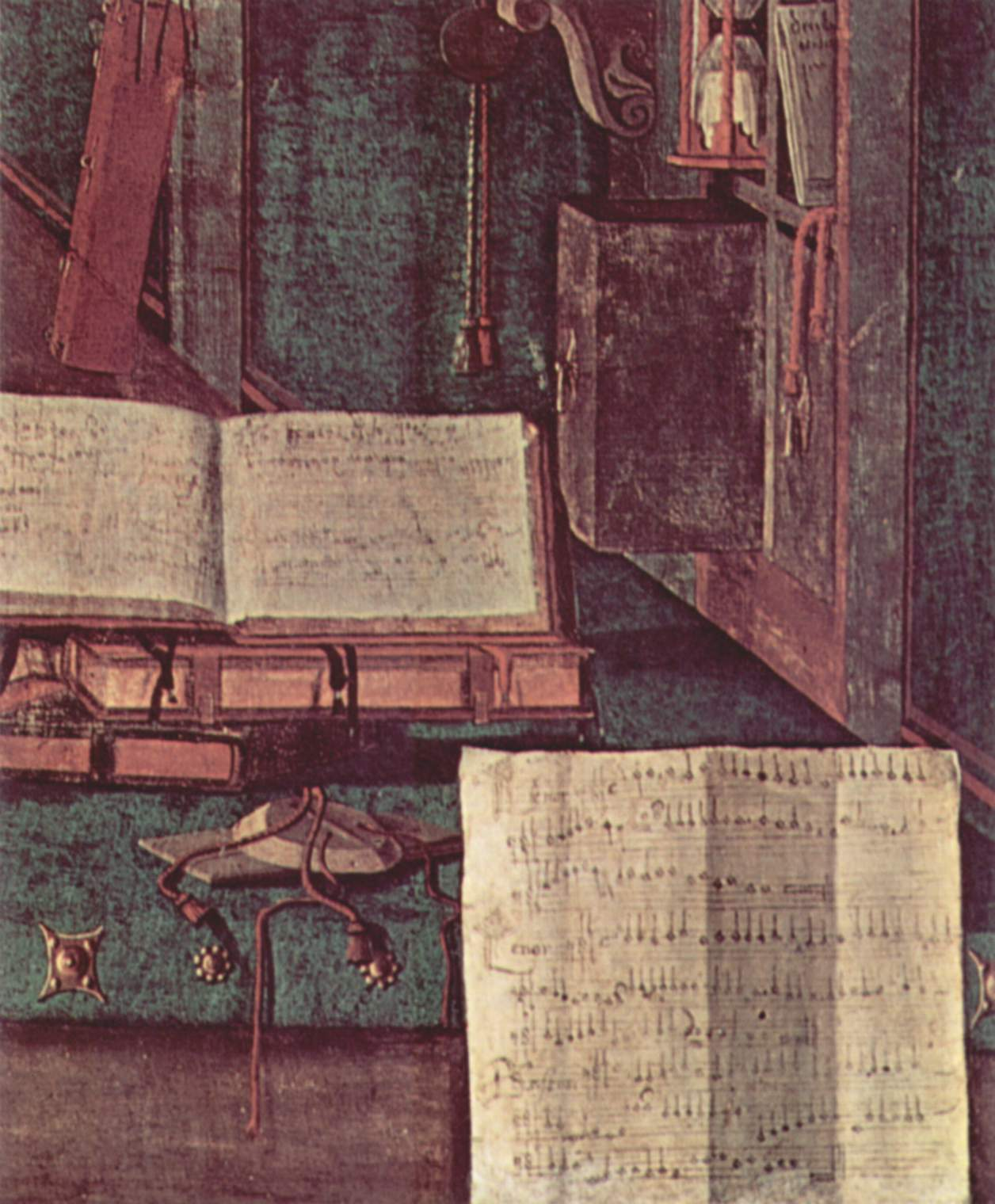
Musical manuscripts

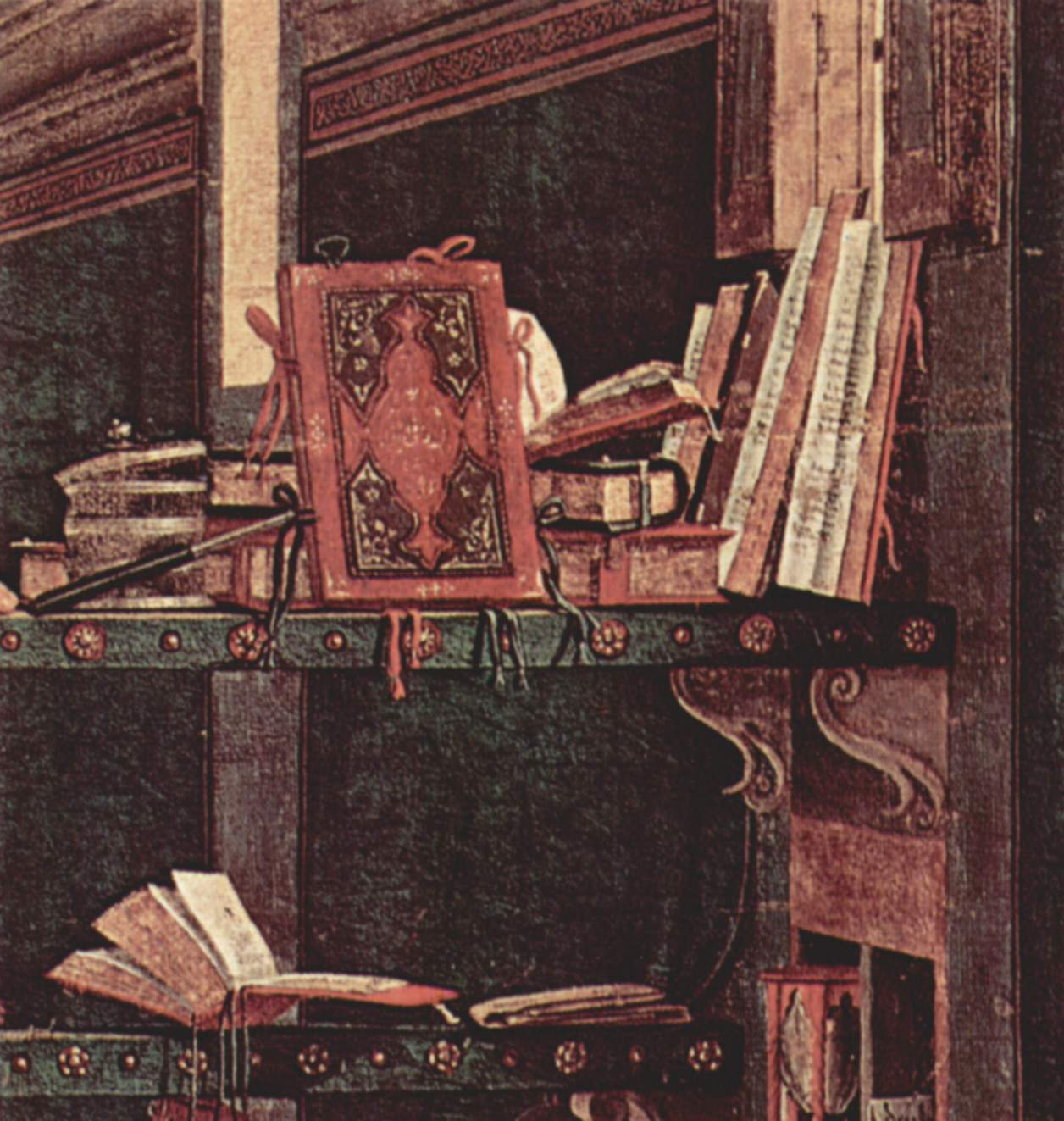
La scrivania (writing desk)

== See also ==
- St. George and the Dragon (Carpaccio)

== Sources ==
- Valcanover, Francesco (2007). "Vittore Carpaccio". Pittori del Rinascimento. Florence: Scala. ISBN 978-88-8117-099-9.
