= Scuola di San Giorgio degli Schiavoni =

HIstoric building in Venice, Italy

Coordinates: 45°26′11″N 12°20′46″E

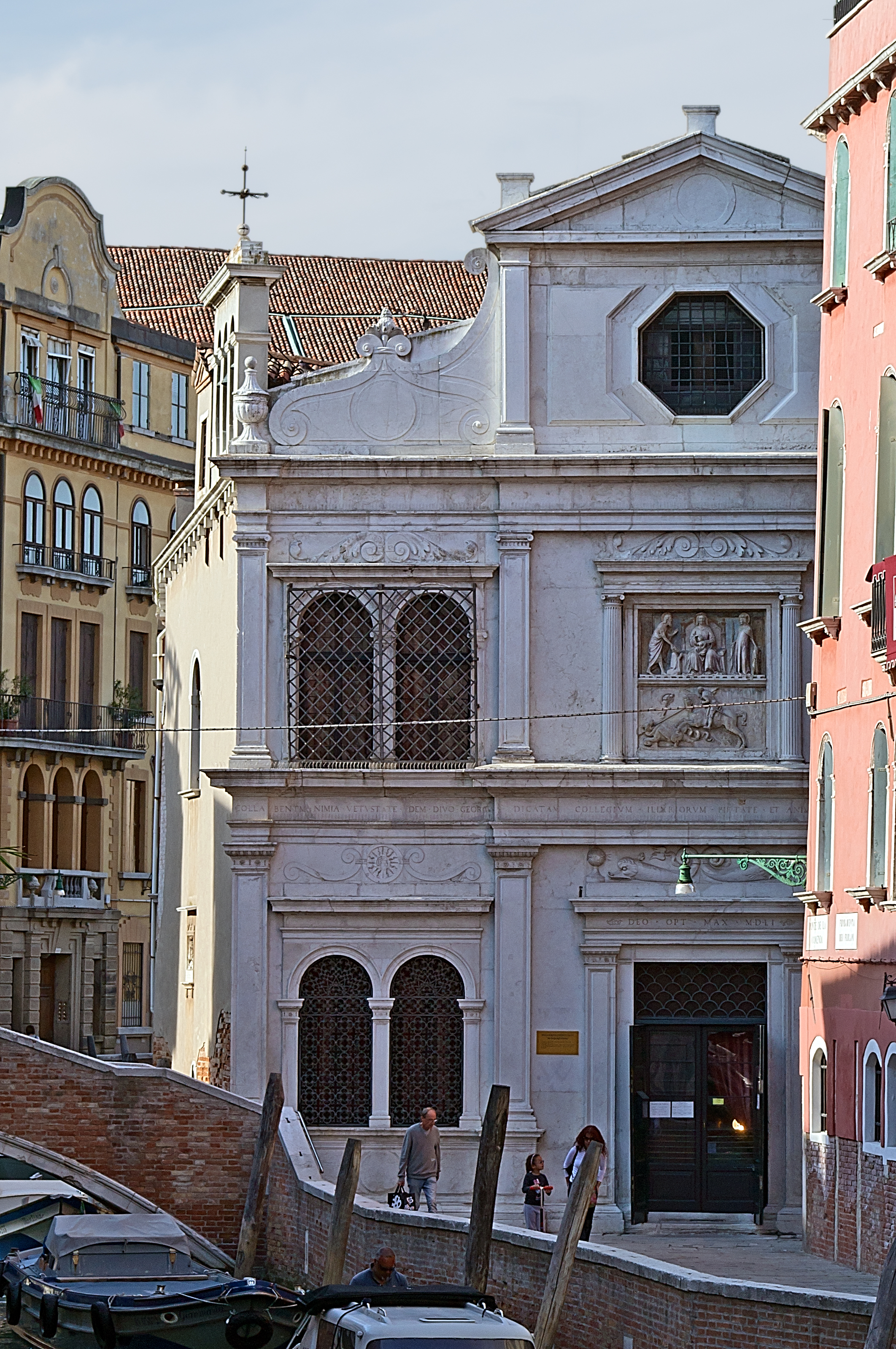
Scuola di San Giorgio degli Schiavoni

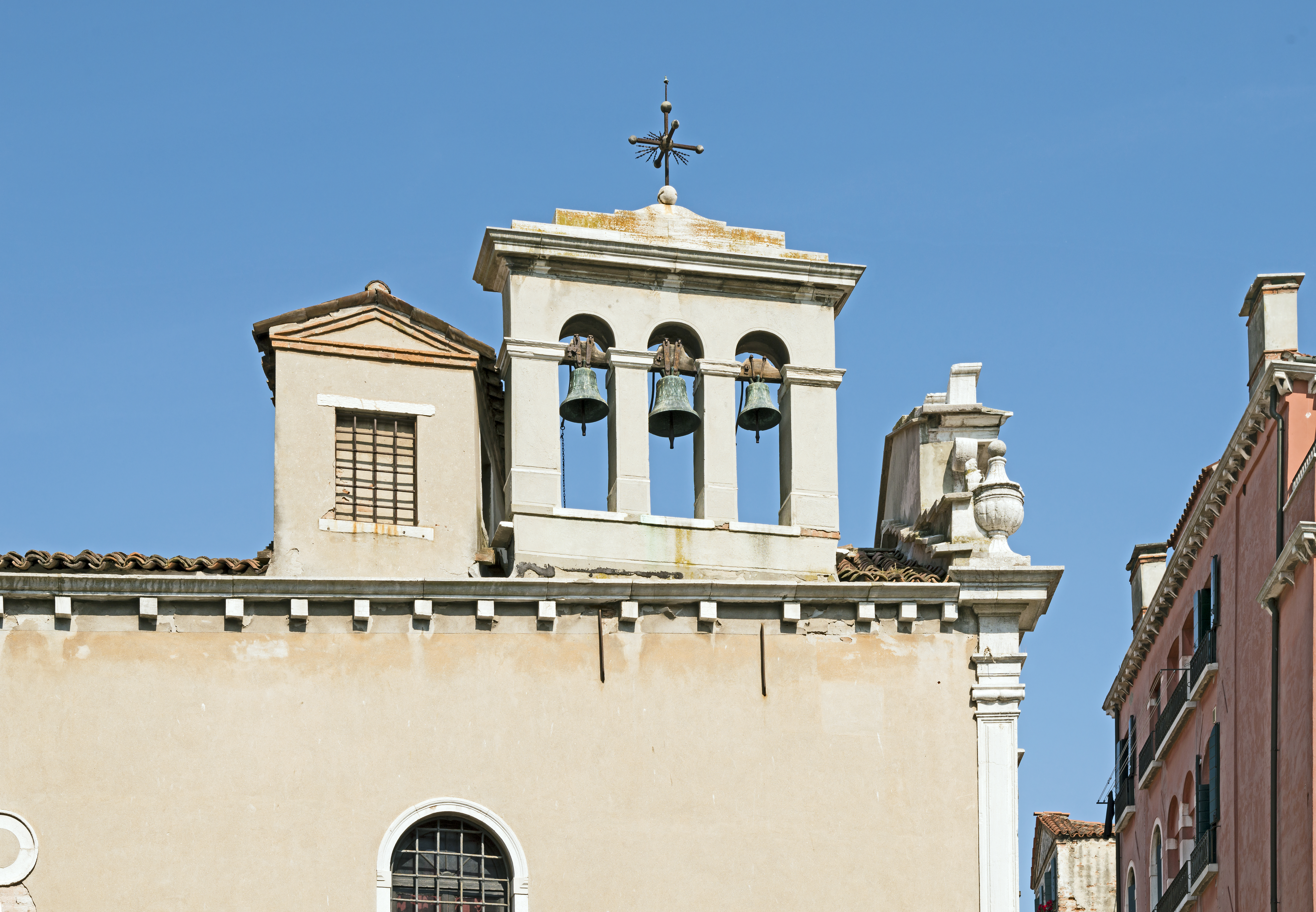
Bell gable

The Scuola di San Giorgio degli Schiavoni in Venice, northern Italy, was one of the city's confraternities, a scuola piccola located in the sestiere (neighborhood) of Castello, Venice. Its building has been preserved.

== History ==
Since the early Middle Ages, Venice had intense commercial relationships with Dalmatia, which became even stronger when the whole region was conquered by Venice in the early 15th century. In the city, Slavic immigrants from Dalmatia were called Schiavoni. They formed a brotherhood, approved by the Consiglio dei Dieci in 1451.

Mostly sailors and workers, they initially met on a ground near the church of San Giovanni di Malta. Their patron saints were Sts. George, Jerome and Tryphon, joined by St. Matthew when the brotherhood received a relic of that saint in 1502. In that period the corporation bought the former hospital of St. Catherine in the area, and restored as its Scuola, under design by Giovanni De Zan with a façade inspired by Jacopo Sansovino. From 1502 to 1507 the painter Vittore Carpaccio was commissioned seven panels with the Stories of the Patron Saints of the Scuola, which are still in the building. Other rooms have paintings, decorations and embellishments.

== Description ==
Externally, over the entrance is a relief with St. George Killing the Dragon (1552), by Pietro di Salò and, above it, a "Virgin Enthroned with Saints" (mid-14th century) by a Venetian sculptor.

The ground hall has on its four walls the paintings commissioned to Carpaccio, inspired by Jacobus de Voragine's Golden Legend:

- St. Augustine in His Study
- St. Jerome and the Lion
- Funeral of St. Jerome
- St. George and the Dragon
- Triumph of St. George
- Baptism of the Selenites
- St. Tryphon and the Basilisk

There are also two evangelic depictions, also by Carpaccio:

- Sermon in the Gethsemane
- Vocation of St. Matthew

The upper hall (Sala dell'Albergo) has a wooden ceiling with painted decorations by Bastian de Muran, and, on the walls, other paintings of Jacopo Palma the Younger school. At the altar is a Patron Saint of the Scuola with, at its sides, two gilt panels of St. Jerome and St. Tryphon (15th century)

== See also ==
Oltramarini

== Sources ==
- Lorenzetti, Giulio (1974). Venezia e il suo estuario. Edizioni Lint.
