= Greek community in Venice =

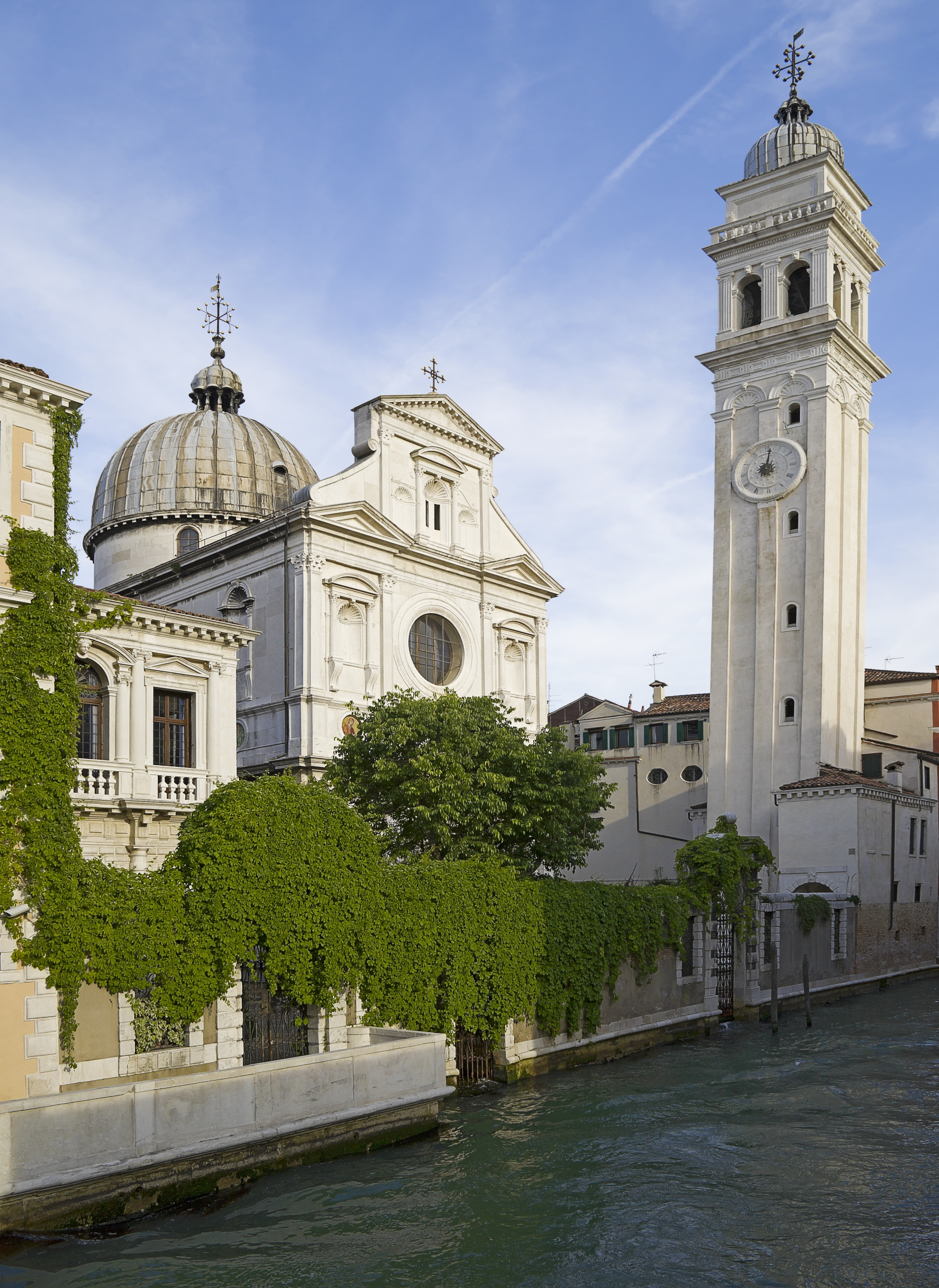
The Scuola dei Greci was the cultural and religious center of the Greek community in Venice.

The Greek community in Venice dates back to the Middle Ages, when the Republic of Venice was still formally part of the Byzantine Empire. Settled mostly in the sestiere of Castello, it reached its height in the centuries after the Fall of Constantinople, when many Greeks, including merchants, soldiers, and scholars, fled the Ottoman conquest. Tied to the Greek world through its extensive overseas possessions, the city became a major center for Greek education and the Modern Greek Enlightenment, being the site of the first Greek-language printing presses. The community declined after the Fall of the Venetian Republic and the establishment of the modern Greek state. The community's property is now largely owned and managed by the Hellenic Institute of Byzantine and Post-Byzantine Studies in Venice.

Because of the long-standing relationship with Constantinople, there is also a noticeable Orthodox presence in the city. Since 1991, the Church of San Giorgio dei Greci in Venice has become the see of the Greek Orthodox Archdiocese of Italy and Malta and Exarchate of Southern Europe, a Byzantine-rite diocese under the Ecumenical Patriarchate of Constantinople.

== See also ==
- Greek diaspora
- Scuola dei Greci
- San Giorgio dei Greci
- Flanginian School

== Bibliography ==
- Tselenti-Papadopoulou, Niki G. (2002). Οι Εικονες της Ελληνικης Αδελφοτητας της Βενετιας απο το 16ο εως το Πρωτο Μισο του 20ου Αιωνα: Αρχειακη Τεκμηριωση [The Icons of the Greek Brotherhood of Venice from 1600 to First Half of the 20th Century]. Athens: Ministry of Culture Publication of the Archaeological Bulletin No. 81. ISBN 960-214-221-9.
- Nicol, Donald M. (1988). Byzantium and Venice: A Study in Diplomatic and Cultural Relations. Cambridge: Cambridge University Press. ISBN 0-521-34157-4.
