= Scuola dei Greci =

Greek school in Venice

Greek brotherhood
- Scuola dei Greci
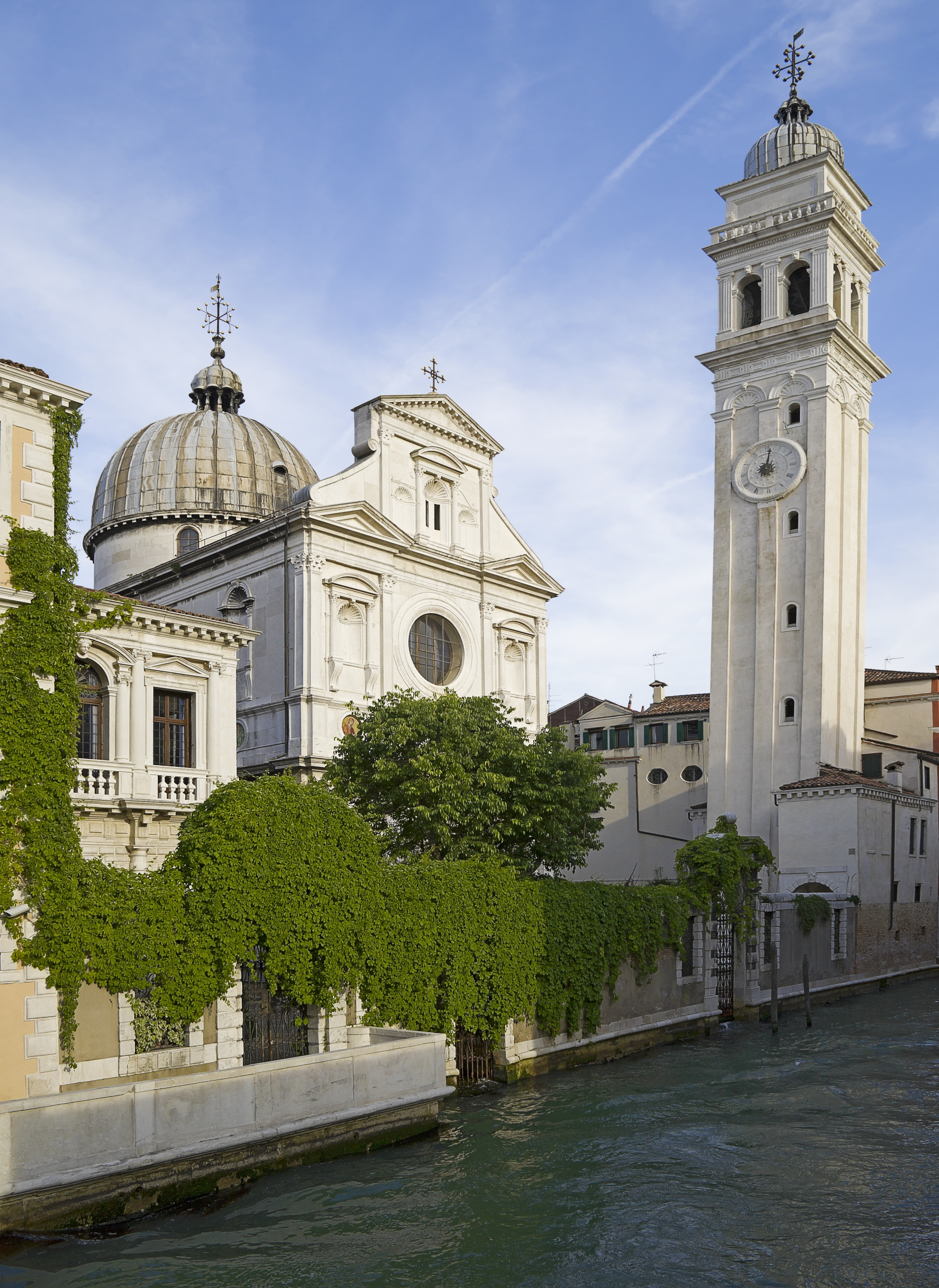
- The Church of San Giorgio dei Greci, Venice
- Formation: 1498
- Founder: Greek community in Venice
- Dissolved: 1806
- Type: Confraternity
- Location: Venice, Italy
- Official language: Greek

The Scuola dei Greci (literally, School of the Greeks) was the confraternity of the Greek community in Venice. Its members were primarily Greeks, but also included Serbs.

== History ==
The Scuole Piccole were confraternities located in Venice. They were formed by migrants who were Venetian citizens or came from the Stato da Mar. These institutions were officially supported by the Venetian state which promoted inclusivity of diasporic communities as a means to instill loyalty to its subjects and regulate the activities and relations of its migrant citizens. They provided an environment for the social, cultural and religious activities of their members. The term greci referred to their religious affiliation. The Greek minority was present in Venice as early as the 13th century, but increased greatly in the 15th and 16th centuries after the Fall of Constantinople and the Ottoman expansion into the former Byzantine lands. The Scuola dei Greci was founded in 1498. Serbs and other Slavs appear in the membership of the Scuola dei Greci since its early years (1500).

The Greeks initially used Catholic churches for their gatherings until Venice granted them permission to settle permanently and build in the Castello area in 1456. The Greek community was well accepted by the city largely because of the education and the ideas they brought. In 1539 they were allowed by the Venetian government to build a Greek Orthodox church, the church of San Giorgio dei Greci and formed the Scuola di San Nicolo dei Greci (or Scuola dei Greci), as well as the Flanginian School. This Scuola was one of the few Venetian Scuole around which an entire community developed. Around the Church of San Giorgio other buildings and rooms were built for the meetings of the Confraternity.

Initially there was a stipulation that membership should not exceed 250 persons (despite there being a Greek quarter in the city with a population of over 4000), apart from women and children. The Scuola had a constitution with provisions for voting procedures, representation, and the formation of a council. In 1563 the number of the councillors, the governing body of the colony, was set at forty and was later increased. The officials, headed by a president Gastaldo, were salaried by the community but were under the supervision of the Venetian government. The success of the Greek community in securing formal recognition from the Venetian government was probably due in large part to the increasing dependence of the Venetian state on the military services of the Stratioti. Orthodox Slavs (mostly Serbs) in the scuola came from different Slavic-speaking parts of the Venetian state. They are recorded as di Servia (from Serbia), di Montenegro, dalmati (Dalmatia) and dalla Bosnia (from Bosnia). It has been estimated that in 1533-1562, of the 1044 members of the confraternity about 10% were of Serb origin. After the restoration of the Patriarchate of Peć in 1557, Serbs began to leave the scuola which saw declining membership in general. The last Serbs who paid dues to the confraternity did so in 1556-59. Dalmatian Serb migrants joined the scuola again in the 18th century.

The Scuola had a central role in the development of Venetian and Italian typography. Among the members of the Scuola were Greek scholars who brought classical manuscripts with them from Constantinople. They established printing presses around the Greek neighborhood and acted as editors, translators, correctors, authors and type-designers. One of the intellectuals from the Balkans who joined the scuola was Božidar Vuković (Dionisio della Vecchia), who opened one of the first Serbian and South Slavic printing houses in western Europe. When he was elected president of the scuola, it was named - in his honor - School of the Greeks and the Serbs.

After the fall of the Venetian Republic all confraternities were officially closed by an edict from Napoleon in 1806. The Scuola's funds and many of its precious objects were confiscated.

== Former Members ==
- Antonio Vassilacchi
- Emmanuel Tzanes
- Thomas Flanginis
- Anna Notaras
- Zacharias Calliergi
- Onufri

== See also ==
- Flanginian School
- Scuola degli Albanesi

== Bibliography ==
- Tselenti-Papadopoulou, Niki G. (2002). Οι Εικονες της Ελληνικης Αδελφοτητας της Βενετιας απο το 16ο εως το Πρωτο Μισο του 20ου Αιωνα: Αρχειακη Τεκμηριωση [The Icons of the Greek Brotherhood of Venice from 1600 to First Half of the 20th Century]. Athens: Ministry of Culture Publication of the Archaeological Bulletin No. 81. ISBN 960-214-221-9.
- Plakotos, Giorgos (2016). "Diasporas, Space and Imperial Subjecthood in Early Modern Venice: A Comparative Perspective". Scènes urbaines (28): 37–54. doi:10.4000/diasporas.540.
- Mavroidi, Fani (1983). "I Serbi e la confraternita greca di Venezia". Balkan Studies. 24 (2).
- Veloudou, Ioannou (1872). Η Χρυσαλλισ [The Krysallis Historical Record of San Giorgio dei Greci]. Venice: San Giorgio dei Greci.
