= Scuole Piccole of Venice =

The Scuole Piccole of Venice were confraternities in the Republic of Venice. Unlike the more famous Scuole Grandi, membership in them was not restricted to citizens and indeed some of them were formed specifically for foreigners. Most Scuole, the scolae communes, were devoted to a particular saint or devotional cult, but some, the scuole delle arti, were associated with specific crafts or trade guild, and often obligatory for the members of that trade.

The confraternities were officially divided into Piccole 'small' and Grandi 'great' in 1467. By the fall of the Republic, there were 925 scuole piccole. Almost all scuole, grandi and piccoli, were suppressed by Eugène de Beauharnais, the Napoleonic Viceroy of Italy, in 1806–1807.

Besides commissioning some artworks for their own meeting houses—though not on the scale of the Scuole Grandi—many scuole also donated altarpieces to churches.

Some Scuole Piccoli had dedicated meeting houses; many did not, and met in parish or conventual churches. Some of the meeting places of these confraternities have been preserved.

== List ==
- Scuola degli Albanesi
- Scuola dei Greci
- Scuola dei Mercanti
- Scuola di San Giorgio degli Schiavoni
- Scuola di Sant'Orsola

== Bibliography ==
- Richard MacKenney, "The Scuole Piccole of Venice: Formations and Transformations", in Nicholas Terpstra, ed., The Politics of Ritual Kinship: Confraternities and Social Order in Early Modern Italy, 2000, ISBN 0521621852, p. 172
- Associazione Culturale Venezia Arte, Cultura e Turismo, "Scuole Grandi and Scuole Piccoli in Venice",
- Jonathan Glixon, Honoring God and the city: music at the Venetian confraternities, 1260-1807, 2002, ISBN 9780195342987
