= Scuole Grandi of Venice =

Confraternity or sodality institutions in Venice

The Scuole Grandi (literally 'Great Schools', plural of Italian: Scuola Grande) were confraternity or sodality institutions in Venice, Italy. They were founded as early as the 13th century as charitable and religious organizations for the laity. These institutions had a key role in the history and development of music. The first groups of bowed instrument players named Violoni were born there in the early 16th century.

== Membership and responsibilities ==
Unlike the trade guilds or the numerous Scuole Piccole of Venice, the Scuole Grandi included persons of many occupations, although citizenship was required. Unlike the rigidly aristocratic Venetian governmental Great Council of Venice, which for centuries only admitted a restricted number of noble families, membership in the Scuole Grandi was open to all citizens, and did not permit nobles to gain director roles. Citizens could include persons in the third generation of residency in the island republic, or persons who had paid taxes in Venice for fifteen years. The Scuole Grandi proved to be one of the few outlets for non-noble Venetian citizens to control powerful institutions. Members came from a variety of cultural and ethnic backgrounds including Macedonians, Slavs, and Albanians and represented the working class such as artisans, tradesmen, and craftsmen like stonemasons, cobblers, and tanners. However there were individual members who came from the more elite social classes (the patricians and the citizen) who represented more diverse occupations and were able to fund the meeting houses in which the Scuole would meet.

Their activities grew to encompass the organization of processions, sponsoring festivities, distribution of money, food and clothing to poorer members, provision of dowries to daughters, burial of paupers, and the supervision of hospitals. Among the Scuole Grandi's goals was to encourage living virtuously, and to offer both material and spiritual support to their members.

During the Middle Ages, each school had its own regulations, named capitulare or mariegola. While the Scuole Grandi functioned as independent fraternities, the Venetian state called upon them to distribute money for public purposes, like war, as well as playing a role in grand religious processions that took place throughout the city, like the one that took place every April 25, as depicted in Gentile Bellini's Procession in St. Mark's Square.

Their autonomy was lost during the Renaissance when the institutions were subjected to a specific magistracy that ruled the office of the leaders and oversaw the drafting of capitulars. After a process of secularization, charities lost their Christian identity and were absorbed into the Venetian structure of the state that encompassed an exhibiting unity-order among the social classes of the republic.

While Venice deleted the medieval ius commune from its hierarchy of the sources of law, Grandi Scuole were divided into two opposite classes, and started to securitize their immobiliar investments under the central direction of private banks, even if within the bounds of their history redistribution rules. The Poverty Laws approved in 1528–1529 entrusted from the state to the Grandi Scuole system all charitable and social activities, like handouts, drugs, burials of needy persons, hospices for widows and children, food and lodging for pilgrims, brotherhood for prisoners. The Serenissima kept for itself a residual role in social justice, uniquely related to those forms of poverty that may become a negative element for the new order of the aristocratic republic.

== Structure and physical layout ==
The Scuole Grandi were regulated by the Procurators of Venice, who set forth a complex balance of elected offices, mirroring the structures of the republic. Paying members could vote in the larger Capitolo, which in turn elected 16 members to a supervisory Banca: a chief officer, Vicario (first deputy), Guardian da Mattin (director of processions), a scribe and twelve officers known as the Degani (two for each sestiere). A second board, known as the Zonta was meant to examine the accounts of the Banca.

Typically the main building consisted of an androne, or meeting hall for the provision of charity; the upper floor contained the salone used for meeting of the Capitolo and a smaller room, the albergo, used for meetings of the Banca and Zonta. They often had an affiliated hospital and church. The Scuola often sheltered relics, commissioned famous works of art, or patronized musicians and composers.

== List of Scuole Grandi ==
By 1552, there were six Scuole Grandi, but the first four arose out of flagellant societies of the thirteenth century:

- Scuola Grande di Santa Maria della Carità (founded 1260)
- Scuola Grande di San Giovanni Evangelista (founded 1261)
- Scuola vecchia della Misericordia (founded 1308)
- Scuola Grande di San Marco (founded 1260)
- Scuola Grande di San Rocco (founded 1481)
- Scuola Grande di San Teodoro (founded 1552)

The Scuola Grande dei Carmini was the last of its kind to be recognized as a Scuola Grande in 1767 by the Council of Ten.

== Bibliography ==
- Howard, Deborah (1975). Yale University press (ed.). Jacopo Sansovino; Architecture and Patronage in Renaissance Venice. pp. 64–74.
- "Viol and Lute Makers of Venice 1490 -1630" Ed. Venice research 2012, ISBN 9788890725203
