= Galleria Giorgio Franchetti alla Ca' d'Oro =

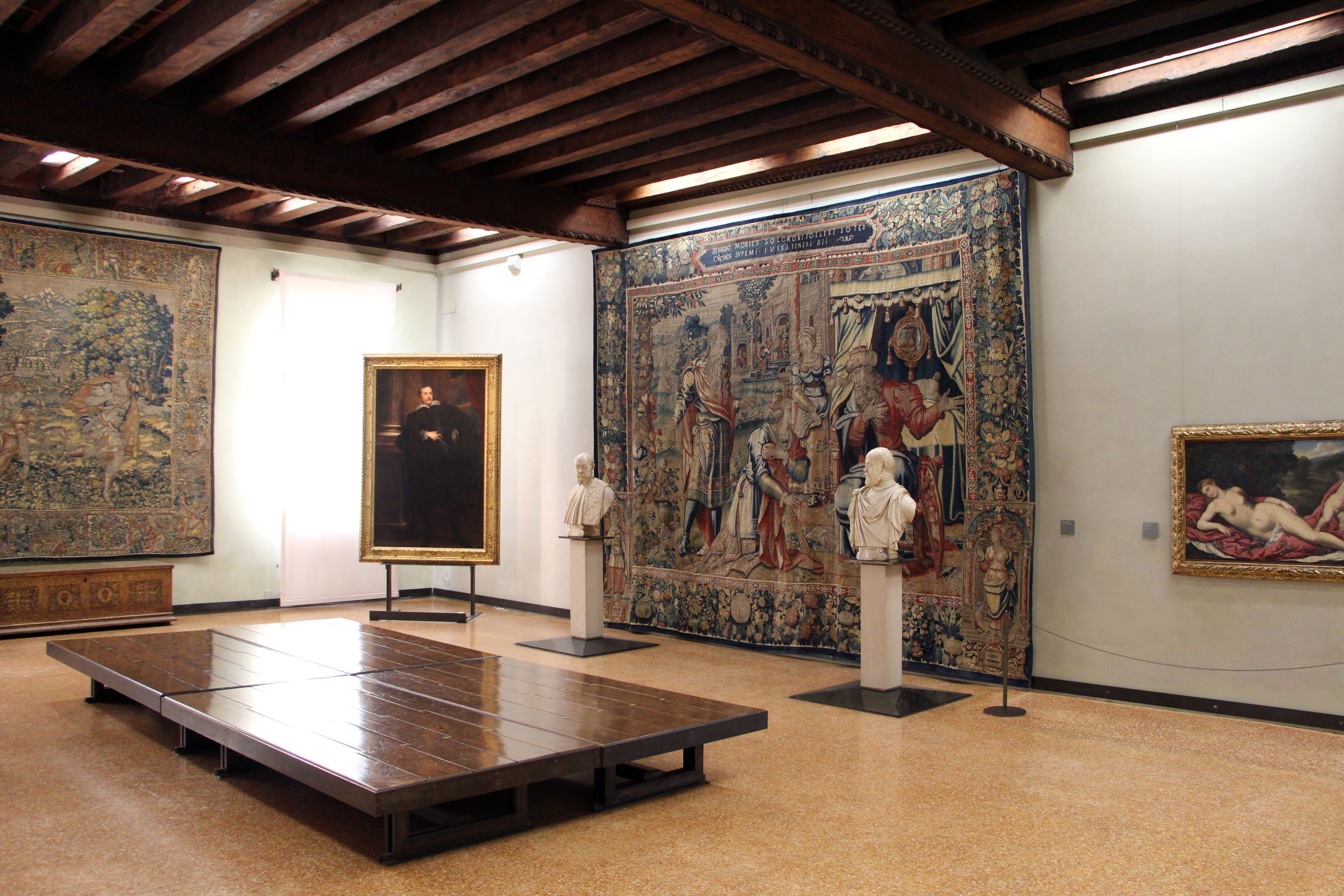
- An exhibition hall on the second floor of the building
- Established: 1927
- Location: Ca' d'Oro, Venice, Italy
- Coordinates: 45°26′26″N 12°20′02″E
- Type: Art museum
- Website: cadoro.org

The Galleria Giorgio Franchetti alla Ca' d'Oro is an art museum located in the Ca' d'Oro on the Grand Canal in Venice, Italy.

== History ==
Baron Giorgio Franchetti (1865–1922), was born to a prominent family in Turin. Initially trained in a military school, he preferred the study of music and collecting art. In 1890 he married Baroness Maria Hornstein Hohenstoffeln. By 1891 the couple had moved to Venice, and bought the then dilapidated Ca' d'Oro and set upon restoring the building, as far as possible, to its 15th-century layout.

Franchetti also traveled widely to purchase objects for the palace, including in Paris where he purchased the building's original well head (1427) by Bartolomeo Bon. He supervised much of the restoration, added the mosaic floor collections, designing the inner courtyard mosaic himself, and constructed a chapel to house his painting of St Sebastian by Mantegna. His grandson helped further his wish, stated in 1916, to make the house and collection a museum. The palace officially became a museum and was inaugurated on January 18, 1927.

== Notable works ==
See also Category:Paintings in the Galleria Giorgio Franchetti alla Ca' d'Oro

The baron's collection form the nucleus of the displays, which are augmented by other works from local buildings. The baron's tomb is on the premises. Among the works on display are:

- Apollo del Belvedere by Jacopo Bonacolsi also called l'Antico
- Medal depicting Leonello d'Este by Pisanello
- Medal depicting Gianfrancesco Gonzaga
- Medal depicting Sigismondo Malatesta
- Medal depicting Don Iñigo d'Avalos
- Medal depicting Vittorino da Feltre
- Medal depicting Sultan Mehmed II by Gentile Bellini
- Medal depicting Lorenzo and Giuliano de' Medici by Bertoldo di Giovanni
- Madonna and Child (15th century) by Michele Giambono
- Madonna and Child (15th century) by the studio of Alvise Vivarini
- Madonna della Misericordia and Stories of St Bartholemew, polyptych by Simone da Cusighe
- Wooden ceiling from Palazzo Giustiniani alla Fava
- Bronze relief with animals by Bartolomeo Bellano
- Bronze statuette of Education about Love by Venus in the Foundry of Vulcan attributed to Bertoldo di Giovanni
- Bronze copy of lo Spinario attributed to Severo Calzetta
- Bronze statuette of Winged Victory
- Bronze statuette of Bacchus and Pomona by Pierino da Vinci
- Bronze statuette of Winged Mercury by the school of Giambologna
- Annunciation, Visitation, and Death of the Virgin (early 16th century) by Vittore Carpaccio
- Christ of Piety between to Angels (1529) by Marco Palmezzano
- Bronze statuette of Two Putti Musicians by Niccolò Roccatagliata
- Bronze statuette of Sleeping Youth by Tiziano Minio
- Bronze statuette of Milo by Alessandro Vittoria
- Pieta with St Jerome, St John Evangelist, and Donor (1500s) by Giovanni Agostino da Lodi
- Four Doctors of the Church (late 15th century) by Carlo Braccesco
- Coronation of the Virgin by Andrea di Bartolo
- Wedding Plate with scene of Ercole al Bivio by Gerolamo di Giovanni di Benvenuto
- Birth Plate by Domenico di Bartolo
- Madonna and Child by Francesco Botticini
- Crucifixion by Giovanni Boccati
- Story of Lucretia by Biagio di Antonio Tucci
- Portrait of Marcello Durazzo (1622–1627) by Anthony van Dyck
- Portrait of Procurator Nicolò Priuli (1545) by Jacopo Tintoretto
- Venus before Mirror by Titian
- Venus Sleeping by Paris Bordone
- Bust of Procurator Marino Grimani by Alessandro Vittoria
- David and Bathsheba (16th century) Belgian tapestry
- St Sebastian by Andrea Mantegna
- Double marble portrait by Tullio Lombardo
- Charity of San Martin by Andrea Briosco also called il Riccio
- Madonna and Child, marble sculpture by Jacopo Sansovino
- Last Supper, marble sculpture attributed to Tullio Lombardo
- St Jerome in prayer attributed to Daniel Hopfer
- Mourning over the Dead Christ attributed to the school of Dürer
- Crucifixion by Jan van Eyck
- Landscape with St Jerome by Studio of Joachim Patinir
- Veduta of the Temple of Sybil at Tivoli by Marten Ryckaert
- Sleeping Woman by Gabriël Metsu
- Winter Landscape by Adriaen van de Velde
- Veduta di mare con vascelli by Willem van de Velde the younger
- Still-life with Dog and Game by Jan Fyt
- Still life with uccelli palustri by David de Coninck
- Exile of Adam and Eve from Paradise, Christ and the Samaritan, and Christ and the Magdalen, frescoes by Pordenone
- Virtues, frescoes by Domenico Campagnola
- Facade frescoes (degraded) by Titian for Fondaco dei Tedeschi
- Rio della Plata, terracotta model for Fountain of the Four Rivers, by Gian Lorenzo Bernini
- Mythologic subjects, terracotta by Stefano Maderno
- Sketches for Telamons for Library of San Giovanni e Paolo by Giacomo Piazzetta
- Veduta of the Piazetta towards San Giorgio by Francesco Guardi
- Veduta of the Wharf towards the Salute by Francesco Guardi
