= Justice (Titian) =

C. 1508 painting by Titian

Justice or Judith
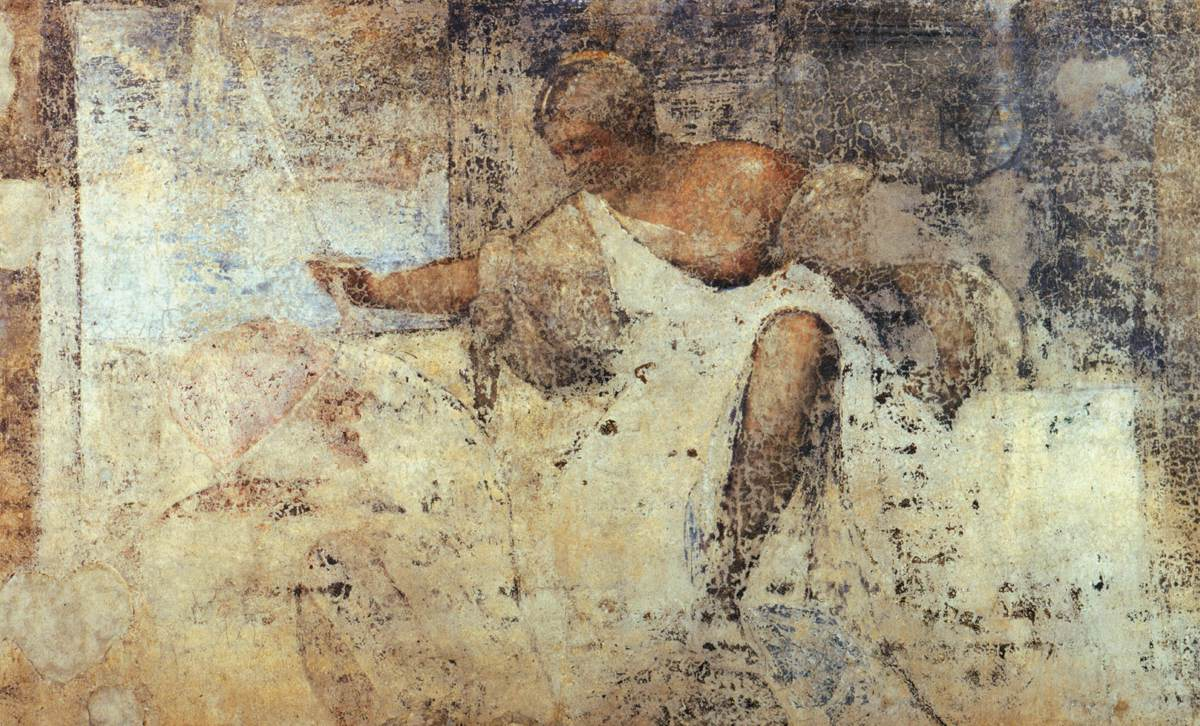
- Artist: Titian
- Year: c. 1508
- Medium: dry fresco
- Dimensions: 212 cm × 346 cm (83 in × 136 in)
- Location: Galleria Giorgio Franchetti alla Ca' d'Oro, Venice

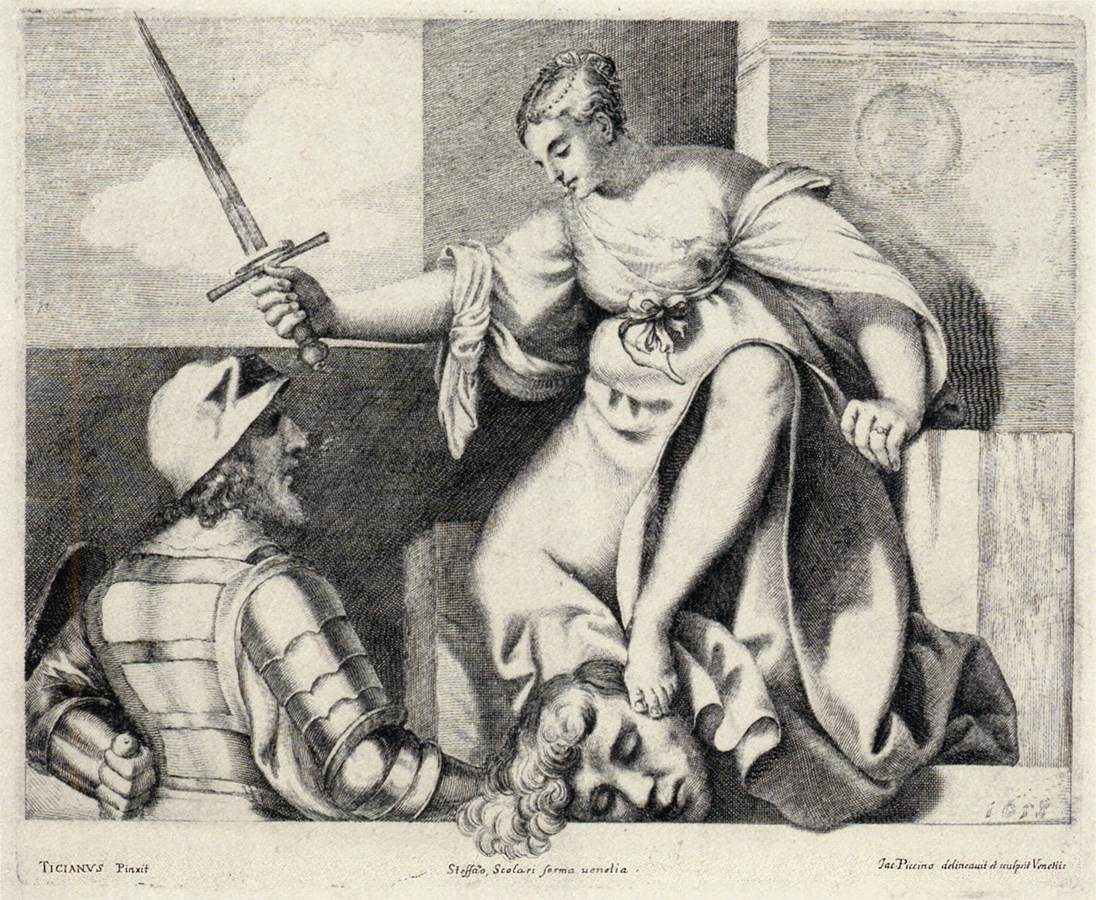
Print of the painting by Piccinino

Justice or Judith is a dry fresco by Titian, dating to c. 1508. It is held now in the Galleria Giorgio Franchetti alla Ca' d'Oro, in Venice. The original title of the artwork, as Lodovico Dolce says, is Judith, representing the heroine of the deuterocanonical book with the same name.

== History ==
It was originally on the façade of the Fondaco dei Tedeschi, rebuilt in 1508 after the previous building was destroyed by fire. 1508 documents attest to a dispute over payment to Giorgione - these documents also show that the external frescoes had not yet been completed at that point. The frescoes were to represent symbols of Venice's autonomy, since they were painted at a time of conflict between the Republic and Maximilian I, Holy Roman Emperor.

While Giorgione took care of the main façade on the Canal Grande, he let Titian paint the southern side, leading to a narrow alleyway called calle Merceria, and there Judith was originally placed. Lodovico Dolce records an episode in 1557, when it was mistaken for a work by Giorgione.

Damaged by the humid and brackish climate of the lagoon, the frescoes were taken off the walls during the twentieth century, so that in 1967 Judith was finally placed into Ca' d'Oro.

== Bibliography ==
- (in Italian) Alessandra Fregolent, Giorgione, Electa, Milano 2001. ISBN 88-8310-184-7
