= Rothschild Lamp =

The Rothschild Lamp
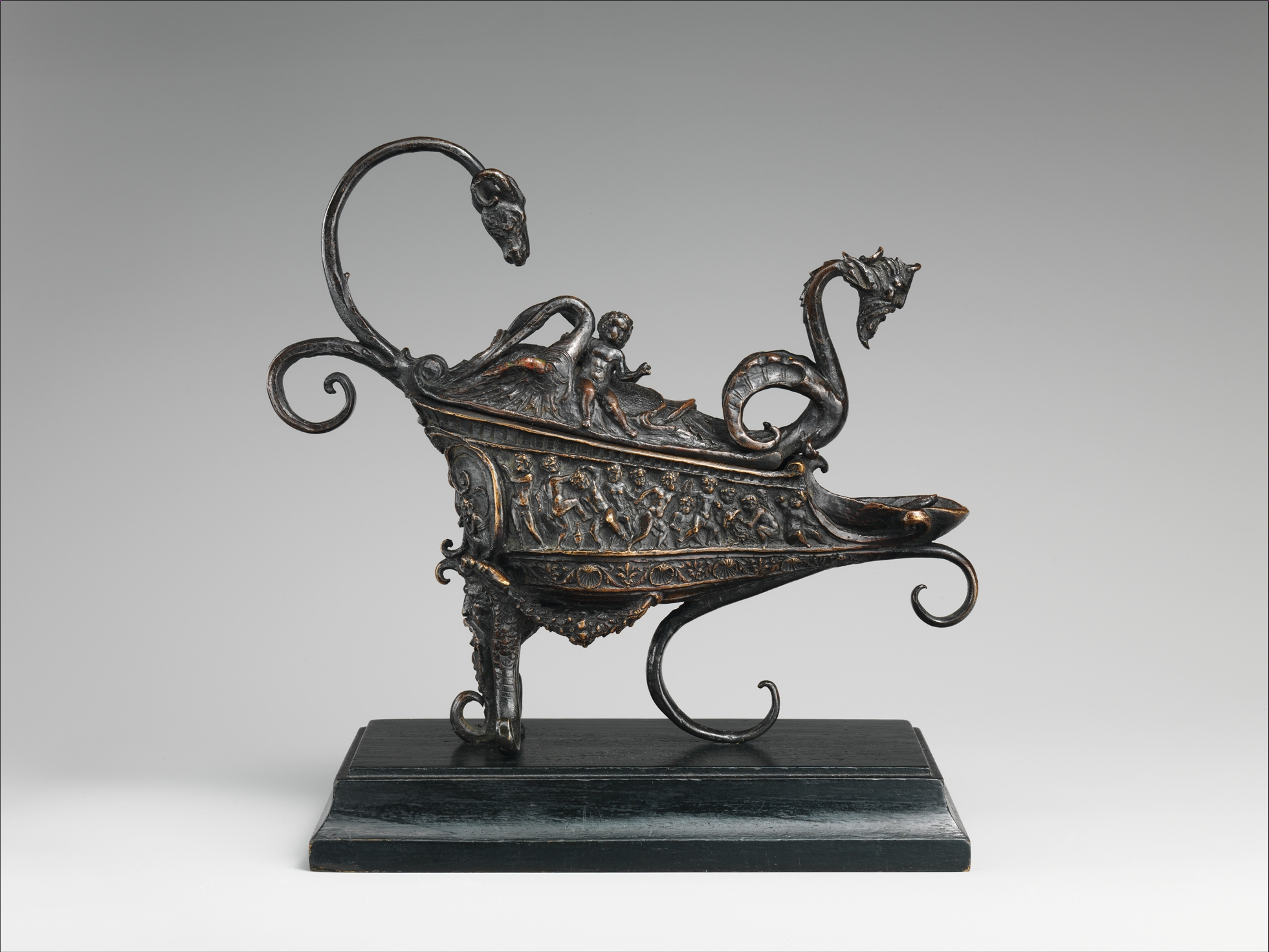
- Artist: Andrea Riccio
- Year: c. 1510–20
- Medium: Bronze
- Dimensions: 19.4 cm × 7.4 cm × 22.9 cm (7.6 in × 2.9 in × 9.0 in)
- Location: Metropolitan Museum of Art; New York City
- Accession: 2009.58

The Rothschild Lamp is a 16th-century bronze oil lamp. Made by the Italian gold- and metalsmith Andrea Riccio ((c. 1470 Padua – 1532), in the 19th century the lamp belonged to Baron James Mayer de Rothschild and then his heirs in the Rothschild family. The lamp was acquired by the Metropolitan Museum of Art in 2009. It is one, probably the finest, of six lamps of similar complexity by Riccio to survive.
