= Fondaco dei Tedeschi =

Historic building in Venice, Italy

Coordinates: 45°26′18″N 12°20′11″E

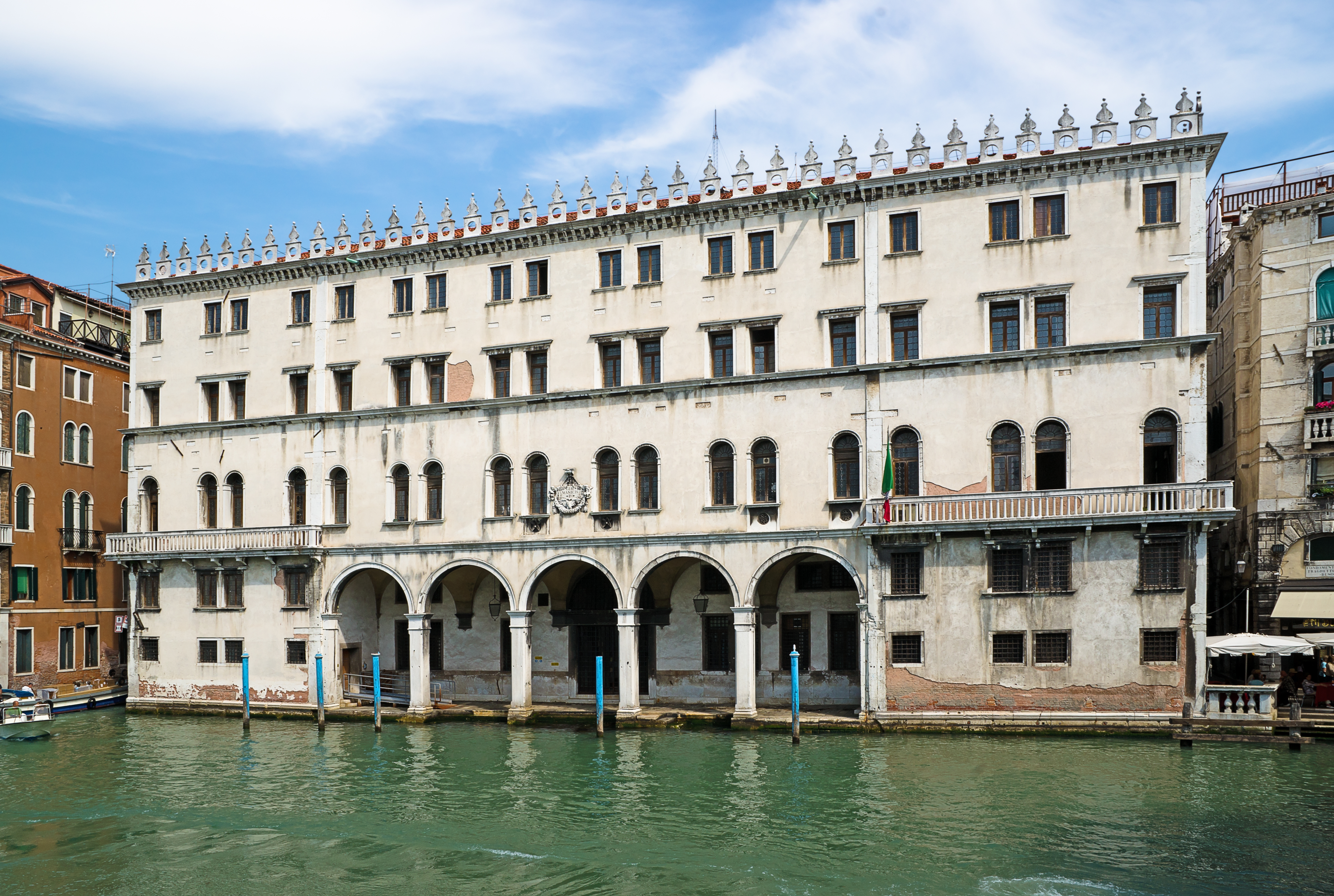
The Fondaco dei Tedeschi before renovation.

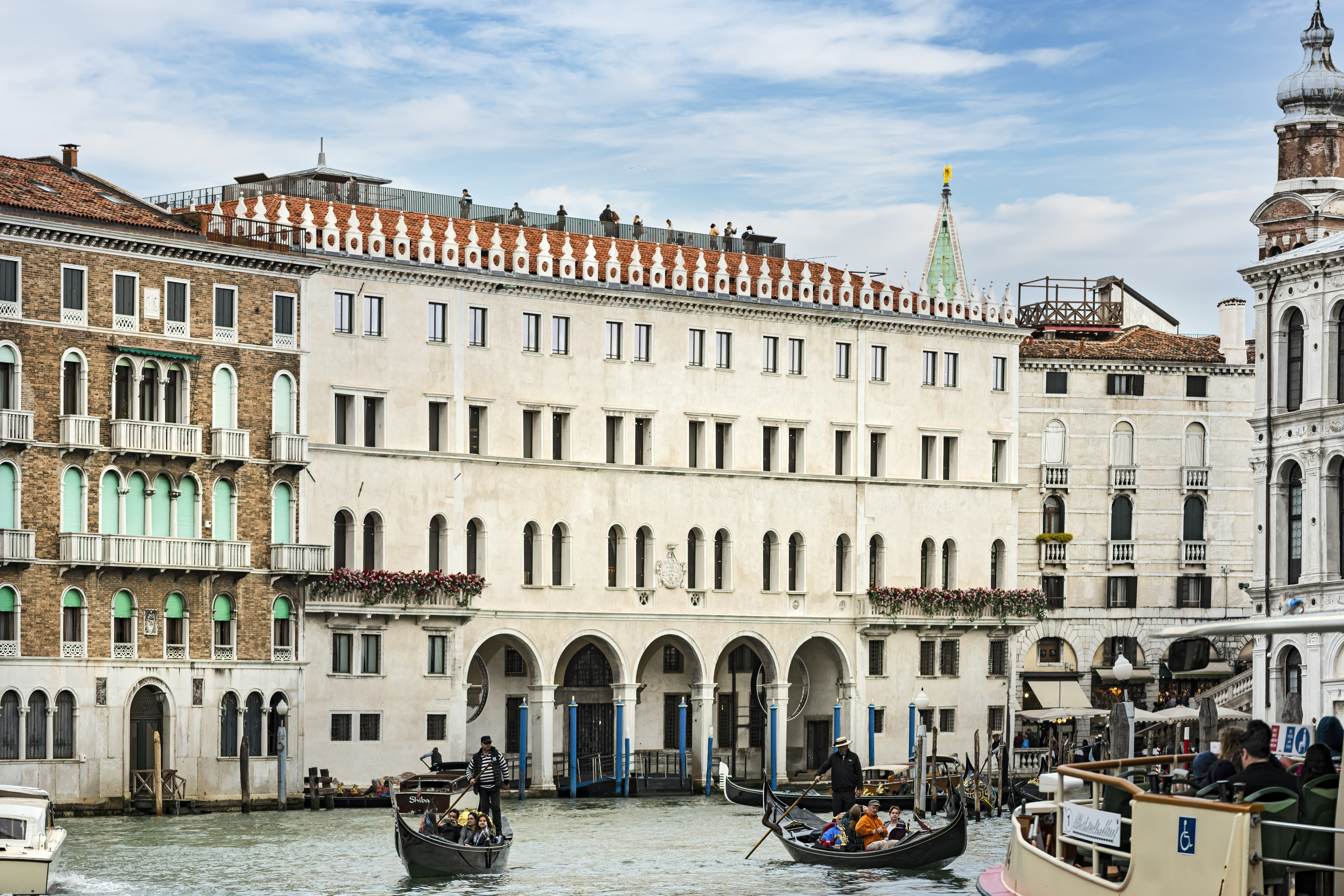
The new façade and the panoramic roof.

The Fondaco dei Tedeschi, a historic building in Venice, Italy, is situated along the Grand Canal, close to the iconic Rialto Bridge. It was a hostel and a warehouse for the city's German (Tedeschi) merchants and their imports. After being destroyed by fire in 1505, the Fondaco dei Tedeschi was rebuilt in a Renaissance architectural style.

It not only endured but also continued to serve its original purpose. Most recently, the building has housed a DFS department store located on Venice's Grand Canal.

== Etymology: Fondaco dei Tedeschi ==
The word fondaco is derived from the Arabic funduk (or fundque) that was in essence a caravanserai (or caravansary)–a combination warehouse, shop, and inn, for traveling merchants. The word funduq was also used to describe accommodation for European merchants in Eastern port towns. The word Tedeschi means Germans.

== History ==
The Fondaco dei Tedeschi was first constructed in 1228 next to the Rialto Bridge, and it was later rebuilt between 1505 and 1508, after its destruction in a fire that took place in 1505. The reconstruction of the building created a practical four-floor building that encircled a large inner courtyard and signaled the beginning of redevelopment in the Rialto region. The architectural style of the building is typical of the Italian Renaissance, drawing inspiration from theatre design and festival decoration. This can be seen in the heights of the building's stories and was one of the first buildings in Venice built with this type of style. The Fondaco dei Tedeschi was not only specifically constructed for commerce and trade, but also is similar to the Fondaco dei Turchi in that the building served as a multifunctional place, blending the roles of a palace, warehouse, marketplace, and living quarters. The Fondaco dei Tedeschi also fed German merchants from cities like Nuremberg, Judenburg, and Augsburg.

Before the fire from 1505, the building consisted of smaller buildings inside that offered storage facilities and accommodation for German merchants. The Fondaco dei Tedeschi played a crucial role in the success of the Republic of Venice, as a hub for distributing and receiving goods to and from the North and the East.

The 1505 fire caused a serious risk to the longstanding trade networks that had flourished there for centuries. Following a practice typical of the eastern Mediterranean and beyond, the ground floor surrounding the courtyard of the Fondaco dei Tedeschi was designated for rental storerooms and accessible by water, while the upper levels were reserved for merchants' living quarters and communal dining areas.

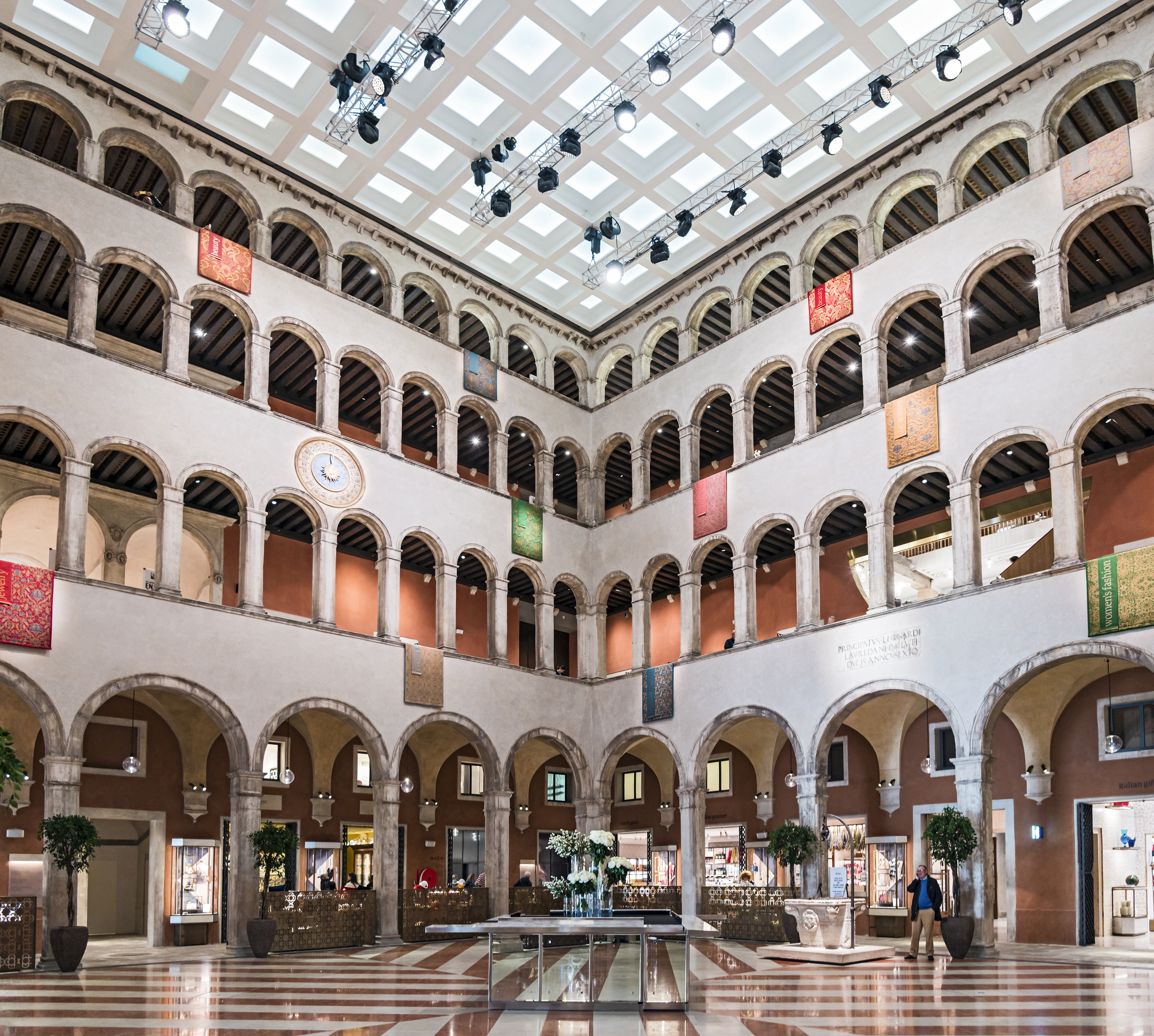
New organization of the Courtyard.

Even though the Fondaco dei Tedeschi has seen both destruction and subsequent repairs over its history, the building's purpose stayed mostly unchanged throughout history. German merchants occupied it constantly, shortly after it was built in the 13th century, until Napoleon's arrival in 1806.

Upon arriving at the Fondaco dei Tedeschi, Germans had to perform a ceremonial handover of their weapons to the Fontegher, the Venetian authority in charge of room assignments, highlighting the formality of the process. As one of the city's most influential merchant colonies, the Fondaco also became a key trading hub, facilitating the flow of goods from the East toward the Alps. The Venetian Republic profited from these transactions by taking a commission on the trades conducted there.

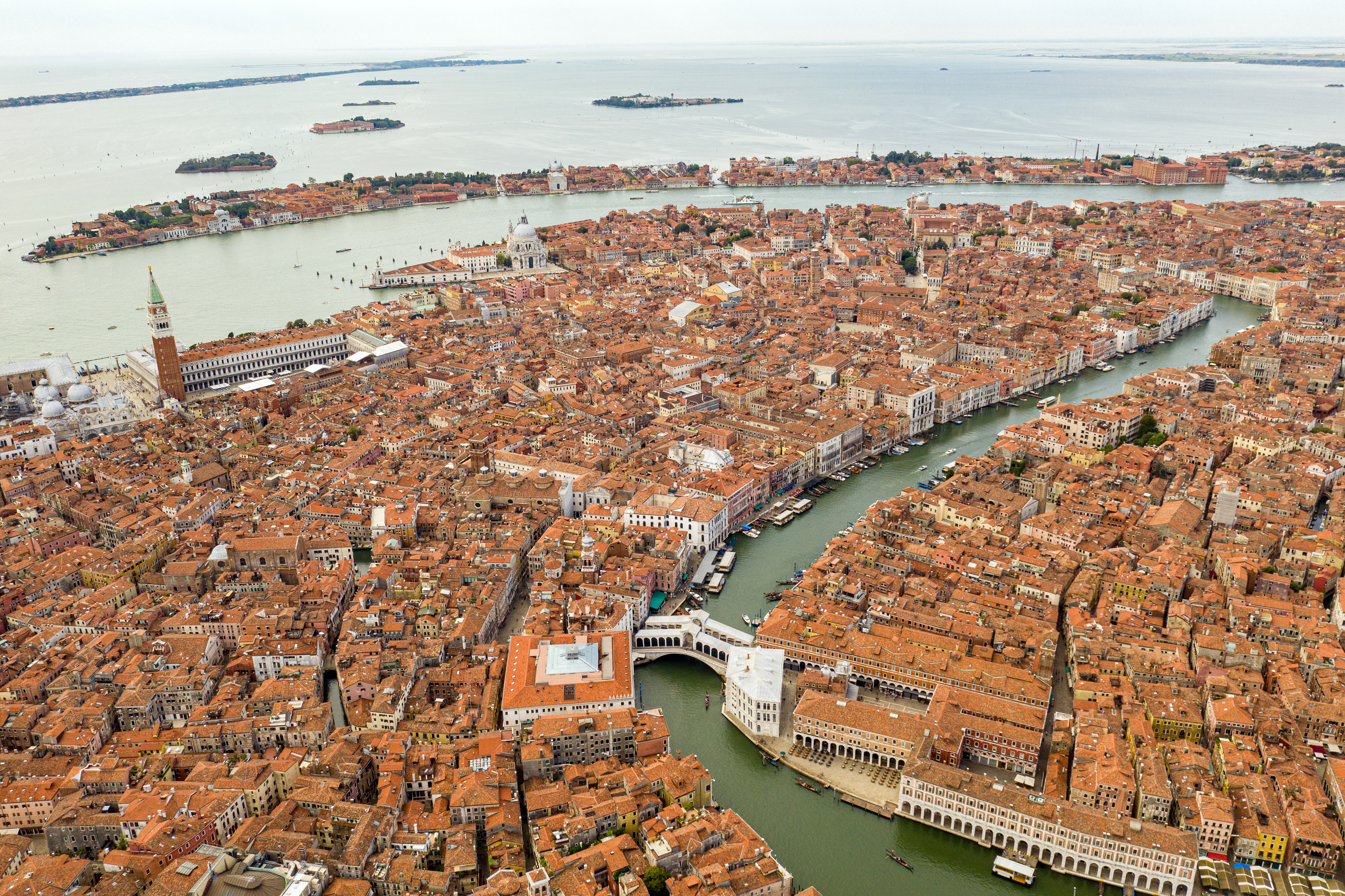
Aerial view of the Fondaco dei Tedeschi, showing location along Grand Canal (note Fondaco is large square building at center)

== Description ==
There are only a few descriptions that exist about the Fondaco dei Tedeschi before the 1505 fire that destroyed the structure. One of these surviving accounts is by a German Friar who described the Fondaco as having two central courtyards which faced the Grand Canal. There is also a surviving map by Jacopo de’ Barbari that shows that the Fondaco was made up of many smaller buildings which were used for storage as well as housing. The original Fondaco can also be seen in Vittore Carpaccio's painting Miracle of the Relic of the Cross at the Ponte di Rialto, were the Fondaco is visible in the background.

The rebuilding of the Fondaco dei Tedeschi after the 1505 fire resulted in a much larger building than the previous one. The new design now had one central courtyard formed by the four sections of the building itself. Moreover, the building had fifty-six rooms and many additional rooms for storage. With this expansion the Fondaco could now house over one hundred merchants, and an equal number of servants, as well as many additional administrative officials. On the canal side, the Fondaco dei Tedeschi had a five-bay loggia where merchandise as well as arriving merchants would have disembarked from boats.

Not many of the original decorative elements that adorned the Fondaco remain on the building today. Of the few remaining decorative elements is a large wall clock that was installed in 1571. Other details that remain are the merlons, which line the roof, and feature circular cut-outs that are topped with spheres.

Compared to Venetian ornamental arts, the interiors of the Fondaco dei Tedeschi were durable and simple to understand.

=== Islamic Influence ===
The reconstructed Fondaco dei Tedeschi was built with many Islamic architectural elements that can be seen in other surviving buildings from far away places like Egypt and Syria. One of these architectural elements is the stairs in the Fondaco that are visually similar to a set of stairs that can be found in the Wakala al-Ghauri in Cairo, built around the same time as the Fondaco. There were also large arches on the lower level of the Fondaco that were paired with smaller arches above, comparable to the design of the Great Mosque in Damascus. These two Islamic-styled features are among the many elements that made the new Fondaco a cosmopolitan building in term of its building style. Some of these elements were even copied in other structures built around the same time as the Fondaco notably several building built by the Fugger family including three houses that were remodeled between 1512 and 1515 in Augsburg Germany overlooking the Weinmarkt.

=== Italian Renaissance Frescoes ===
The building constructed after the fire was adorned with vibrant polychrome frescoes often characterized as dynamic and vividly colorful. All four exterior façades of the Fondaco dei Tedeschi were frescoed by either Giorgione or Titian in 1508. With the new reconstruction and the addition of the frescoes the Fondaco was effectively a German merchant's palace. The frescoes featured scenes with various men and women in different or foreign costumes or nude, as well as important local officials. Only fragments of theses frescoes survive today, due to deterioration by the salty air and humid climate because of the lagoon with only small traces of color remaining visible. Some parts of the frescoes have been saved and can be seen at the Ca’ d’Oro and the Gallerie dell'Accademia, both located in Venice.

Many of the frescoes that are now lost were documented by Antonio Maria Zanetti (the younger) in the mid-eighteenth century in his folio titled, Varie pitture a fresco de' principali maestri Veneziani. Some of the prints in his folio are by him, while a few were by Jacopo Piccino from a century earlier. Among the art works at the Fondaco documented by Zanetti is the print, Female Head and Bust (c. 1760), originally by Titian. Another Zanetti print, Fragment of a Woman (c. 1760), records a fresco originally by Giorgione.

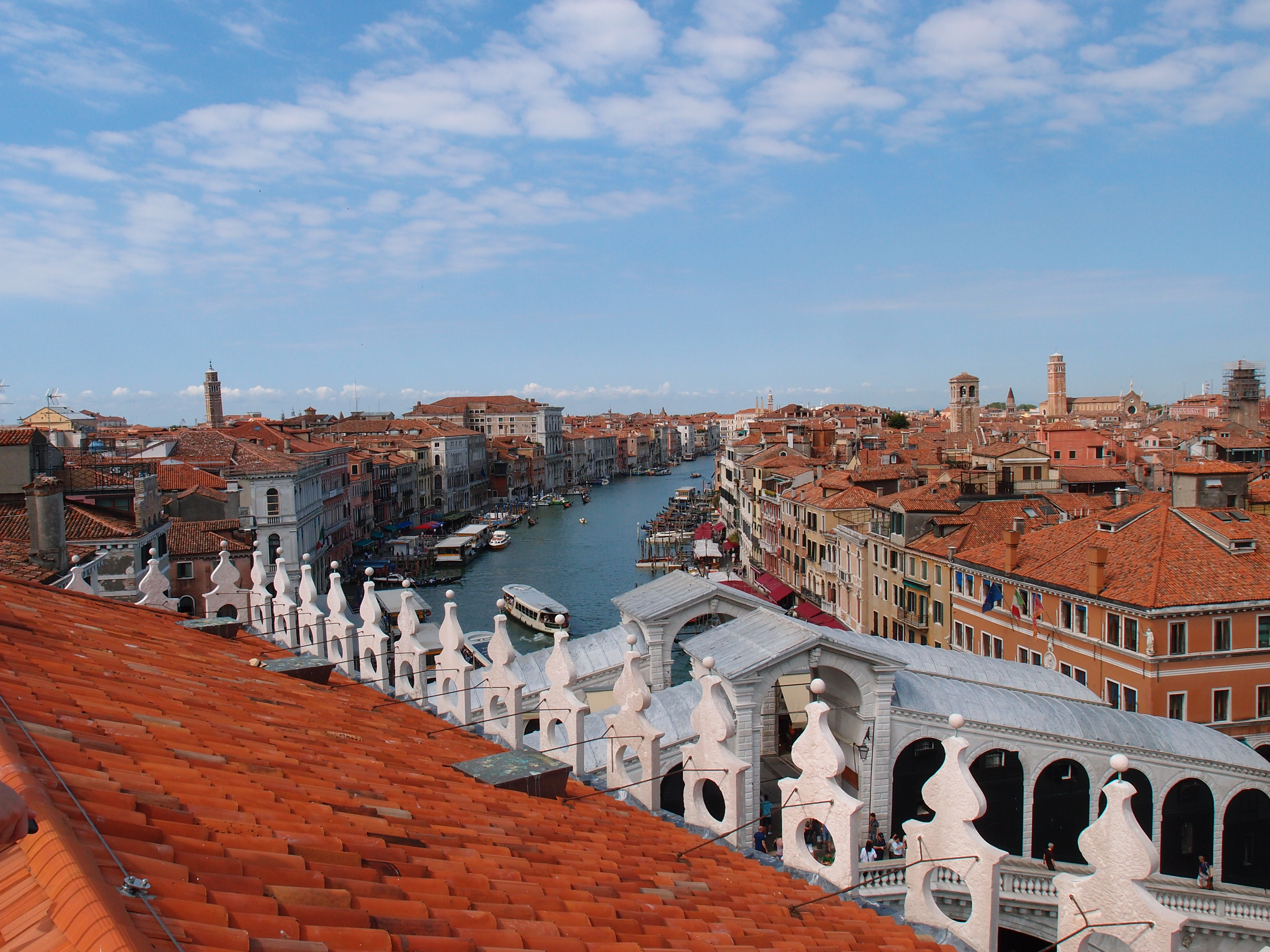
View from the top of the Fondaco dei Tedeschi in July 2017

== Function today ==
Making use of historical areas for business purposes and moving from public to private ownership are themes that are frequently found in Venice, in this case, with the Fondaco dei Tedeschi.

In the 20th century, the Fondaco dei Tedeschi housed the headquarters of the Poste Italiane for approximately 70 years. Then in 2008, the building was sold to Edizione Property Srl, a business owned by the Benetton family, for a low amount. Significant controversy developed after this purchase of the Fondaco by the Benetton Group in 2008, for around 55 million Euros, and when in 2012, the group offered the Venice City Council an extra 6 million Euros in return for unrestricted building permissions. When the Benetton Group announced their plans for the renovation of the Fondaco, the Venetian community protested in opposition with written articles, public gatherings, internet websites, and conservation organization like the Venetian chapter of Italia Nostra.

The Duty Free Shop (DFS) Group stated at that time that construction began in 2014 and was projected to be finished by June 2016. Later, the building's management was taken over by this French luxury retailer.

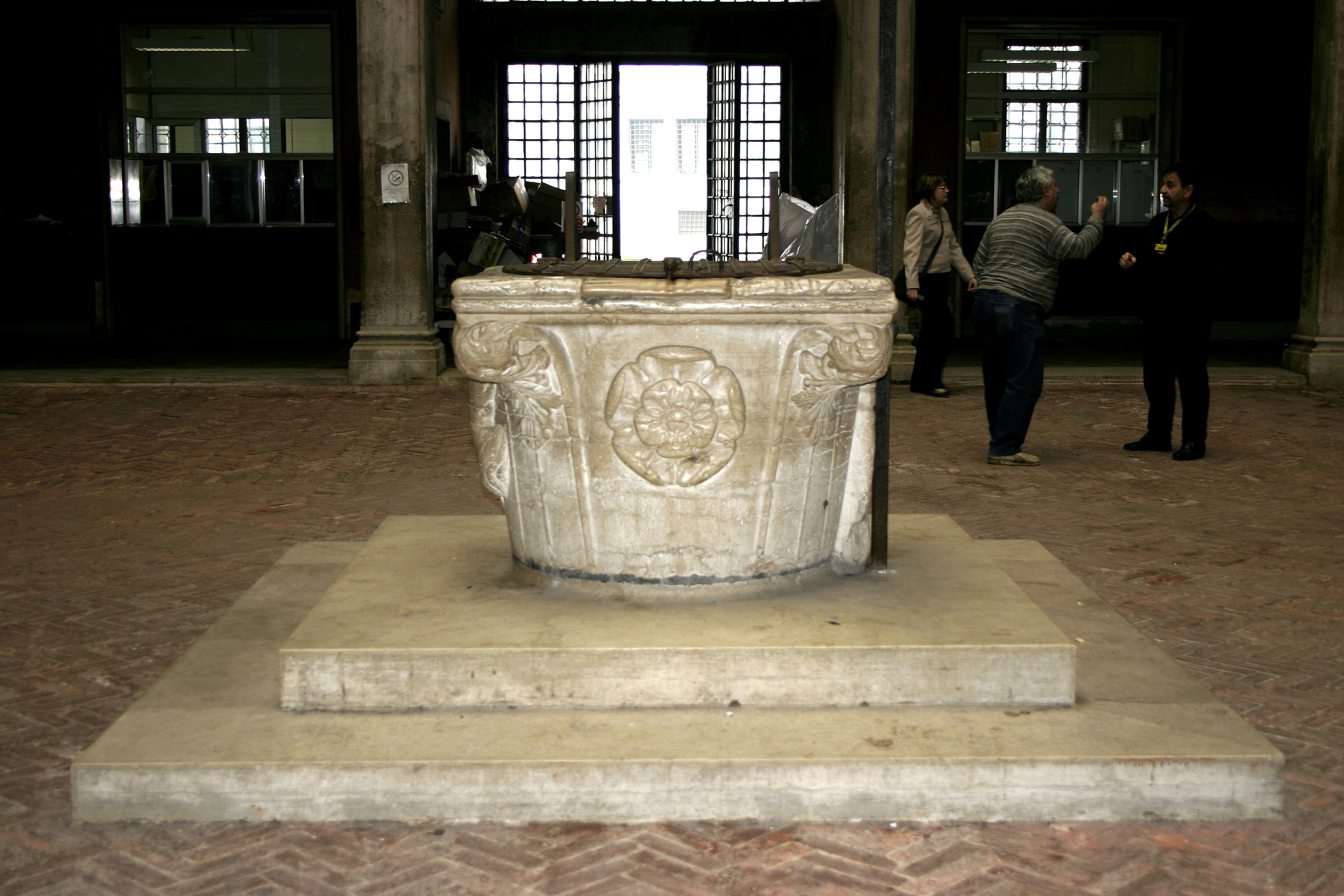
Well in the Fondaco dei Tedeschi before renovation in 2014.

Until the end of April 2025, the fondaco served as a luxury department store. It housed a restaurant, cafe, souvenir shops, and shops selling items made by local craftsmen. The courtyard contains a medieval well, and provided space for people to gather. This main courtyard is under a glass and steel roof that resembles a coffered ceiling, but actually forms a new floor above the central courtyard. A new loggia was also added during the 2014-2016 reconstruction, which was built to house several new escalators.

Since May 2025, the department store has closed down with no clear communication about future plans. The rooftop terrace is also closed, and visits can no longer be booked.

== See also ==
- Venetian Ghetto
- Fondaco dei Turchi
- San Bartolomeo, Venice
- Feast of the Rosary (Dürer)
- Fondaco del Megio
- DFS Group
- Justice (Titian)
- Venice
- list of buildings and structures in Venice
- List of painters and architects of Venice
- Rialto
- Rialto Bridge

== Sources ==
- Brusegan, Marcello (2005). La grande guida dei monumenti di Venezia. Rome: Newton & Compton. ISBN 88-541-0475-2.
