= Shouting Horseman =

Sculpture by Andrea Riccio

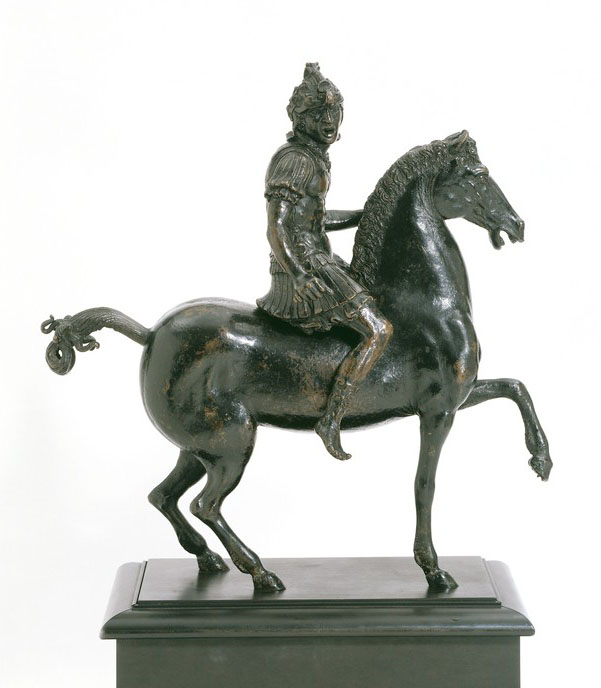
Statuette of The Shouting Horseman

The statuette of The Shouting Horseman was made by the sculptor Andrea Riccio (1470-1532). It is in the collection of the Victoria and Albert Museum in London.

The statuette shows a warrior wearing classical armour and riding bare-back, crying out in the heat of battle. In his right hand, he holds the hilt of a sword (the blade is missing). The warrior's left hand may have originally held a spear or shield. The sculpture was cast between ca. 1510 and 1515.

Bronze sculptures were usually made so that they can be reproduced in several versions, but the lost-wax casting method of casting used by Riccio makes this horse and rider unique.

== Bibliography ==
- Jackson, Anna, ed. (2001). V&A: A Hundred Highlights. V&A Publications.
