= Matteo Raverti =

Italian sculptor (fl. 1389–1430)

Matteo Raverti (fl. 1389 – 1430) was an Italian sculptor and architect of the Gothic style, active in Milan and Venice, best remembered for his work on the Ca' d'Oro, the Doge's Palace, and the Madonna dell'Orto.
