= Simone da Cusighe =

Italian painter

Simone da Cusighe, also known as Simone Dal Peron, (documented 1386 - 1412) was an Italian painter of the late Gothic period, active in Belluno.

His names derive from villages near Belluno, was living in portions of the 14th and 15th centuries, and is thought to have died close upon 1416. The main altar-in the Belluno Cathedral was executed by him in 1397. There also remain of his works:

- St. Martin dividing his Cloak: and sixteen other episodes from his life, from Baptistery, Belluno
- Madonna della Misericordia and Scenes from the Life of St Bartholemew on display at Galleria Giorgio Franchetti alla Ca' d'Oro, Venice
