= Bartolomeo Bon =

Italian sculptor and architect (died after 1464)

Bartolomeo Bon (also spelled Buon; died after 1464) was an Italian sculptor and architect from Campione d'Italia. His career spans the transition between Venetian Gothic architecture and the rather late start of Venetian Renaissance architecture.

Together with his father Zane Bon, he worked in Venice: they finished the decoration of the famous Gothic Ca' d'Oro (1424–1430) and the marble door of the Basilica di Santa Maria dei Frari. They were also entrusted with the construction of the Porta della Carta (1438–1442) at the Palazzo Ducale.

Bartolomeo alone worked at a portal of the Scuola Grande della Misericordia (a lunette is now housed in the Victoria and Albert Museum in London), the portal of San Giovanni e Paolo and the Porta della Carta, which connects the Ducal Palace to St. Mark's Basilica.

== Gallery ==
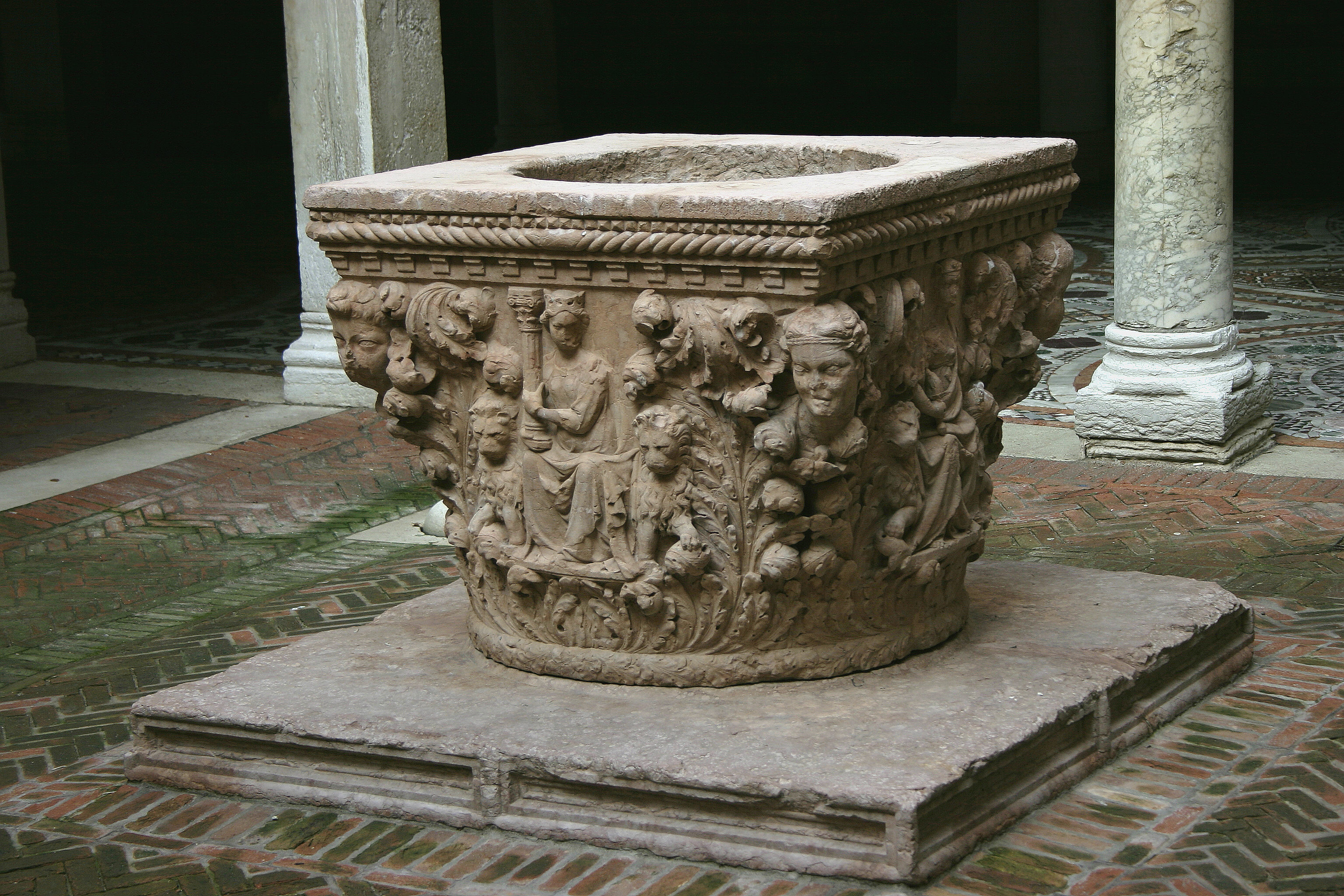
Well of Ca' d'Oro

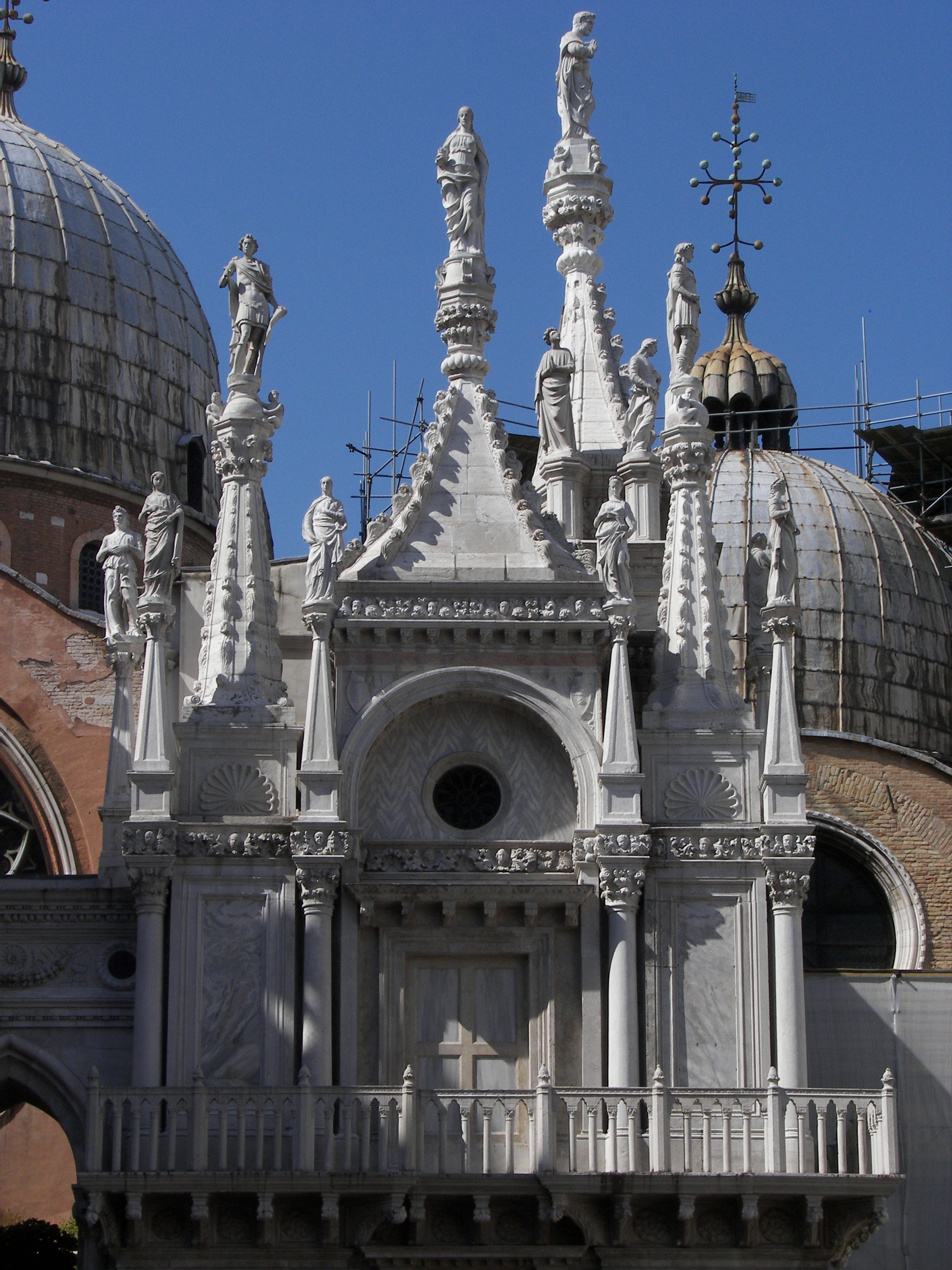
Arc Foscari

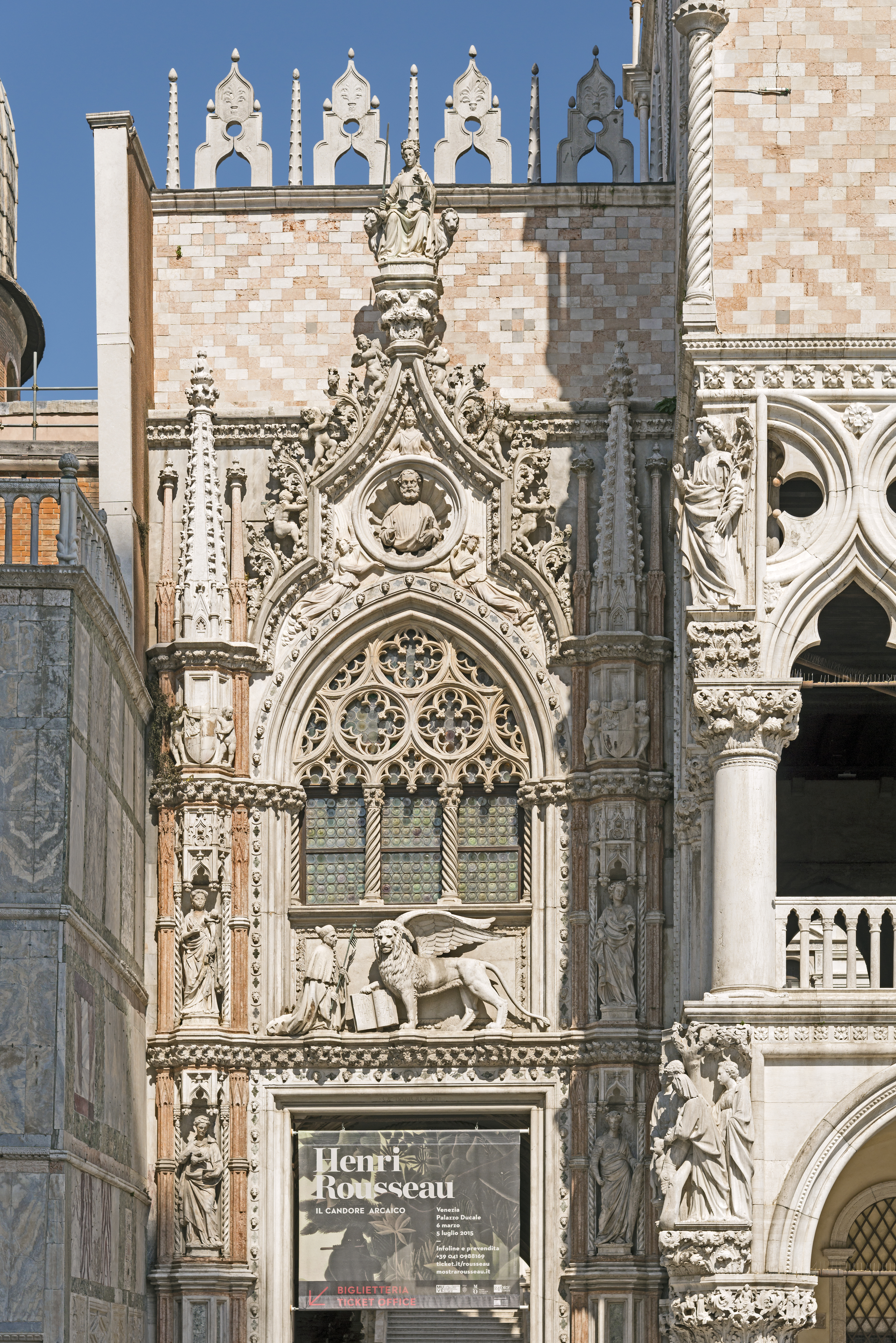
Porta della Carta

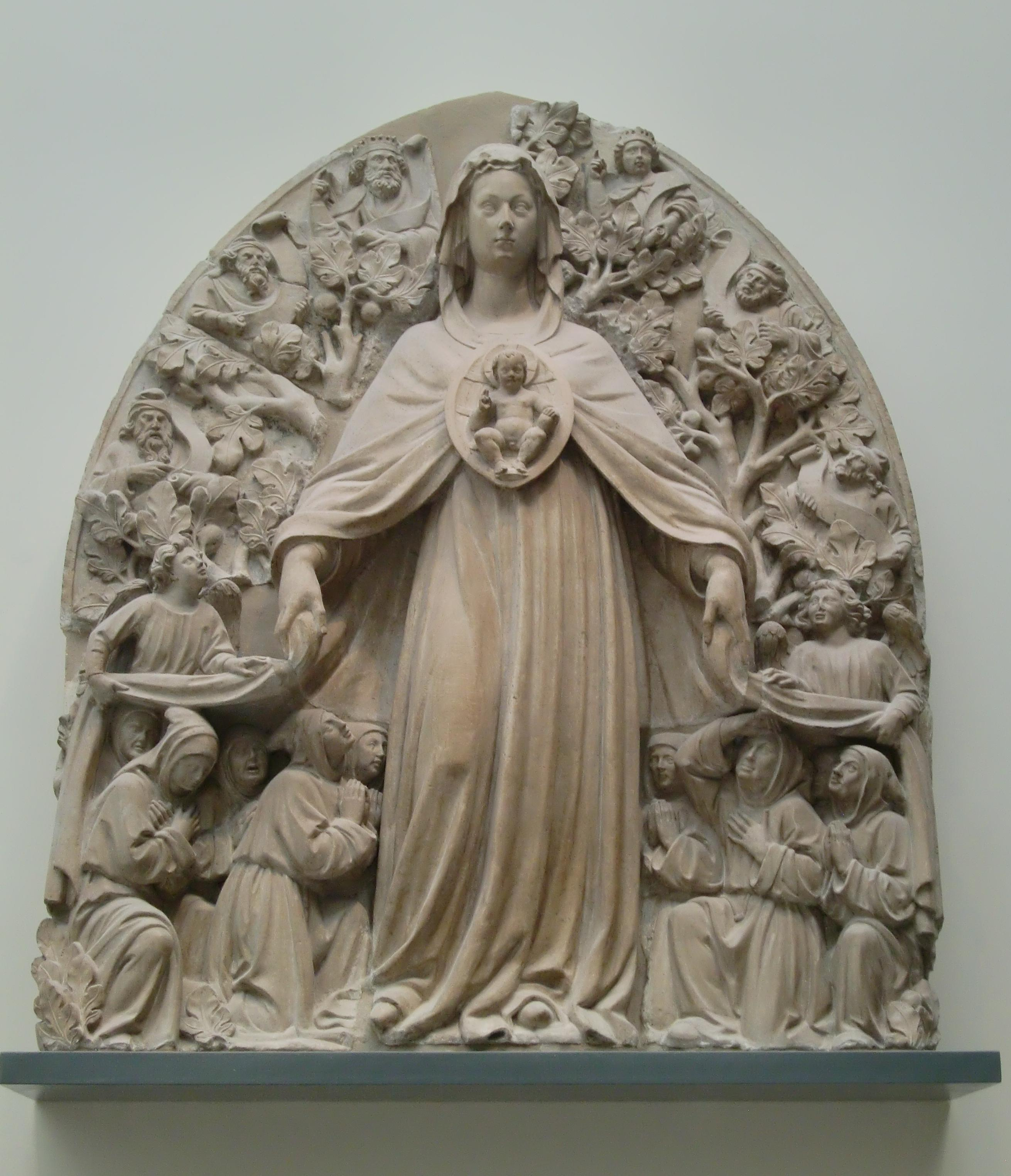
Tympanum of the Scuola della Misericordia

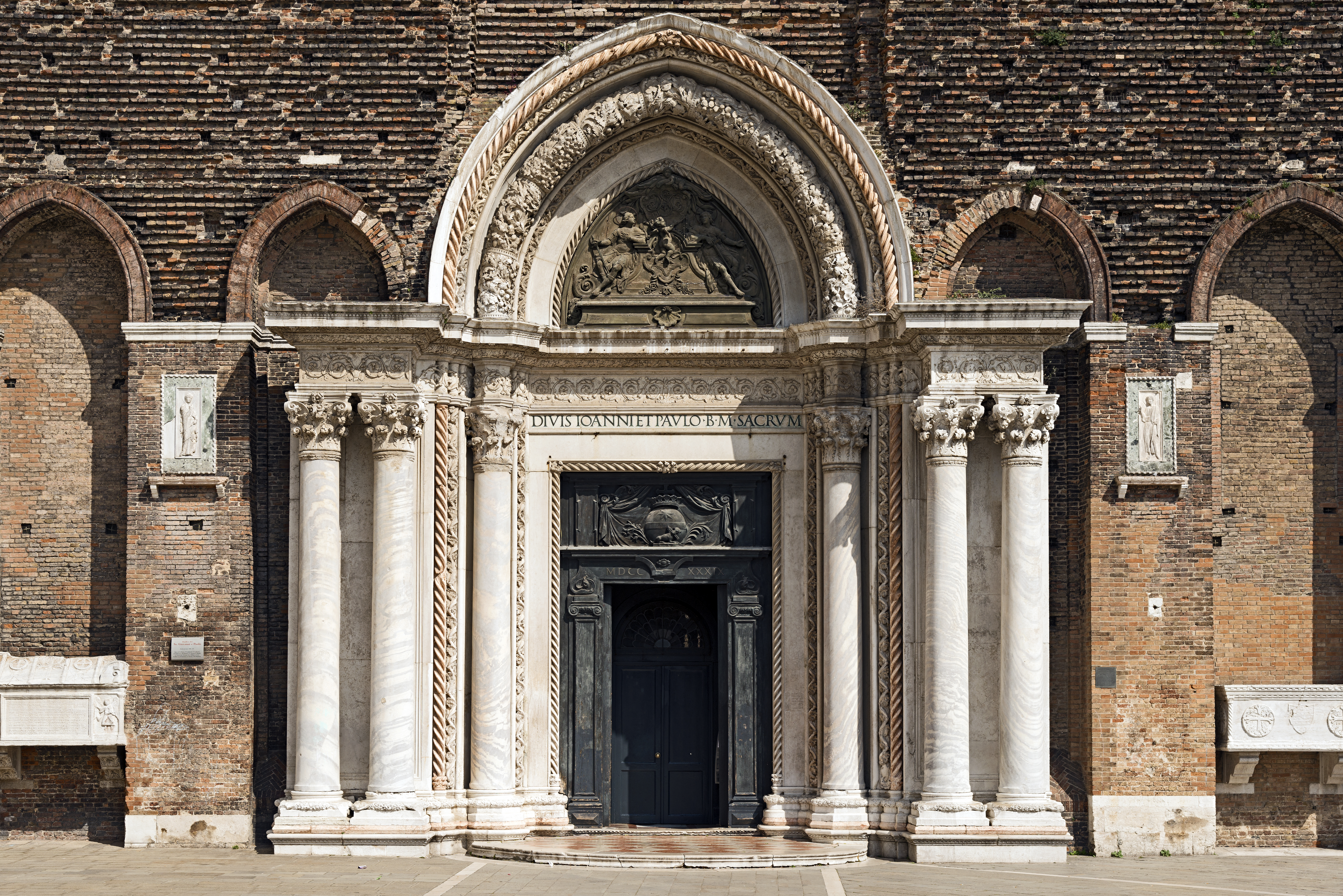
Portal of the basilica Santi Giovanni e Paolo

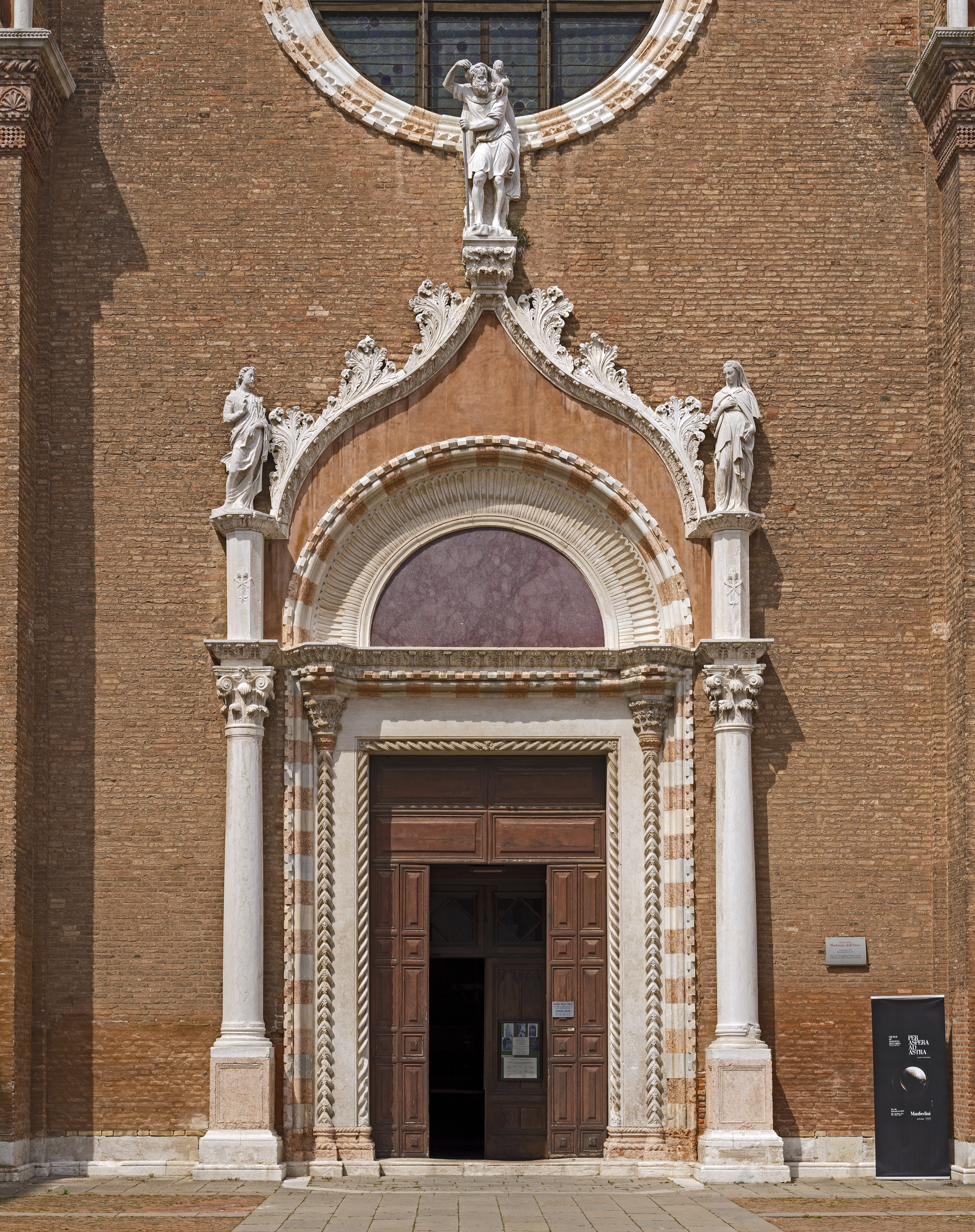
Madonna dell'Orto church portal
