= Bartolomeo Bellano =

Italian sculptor

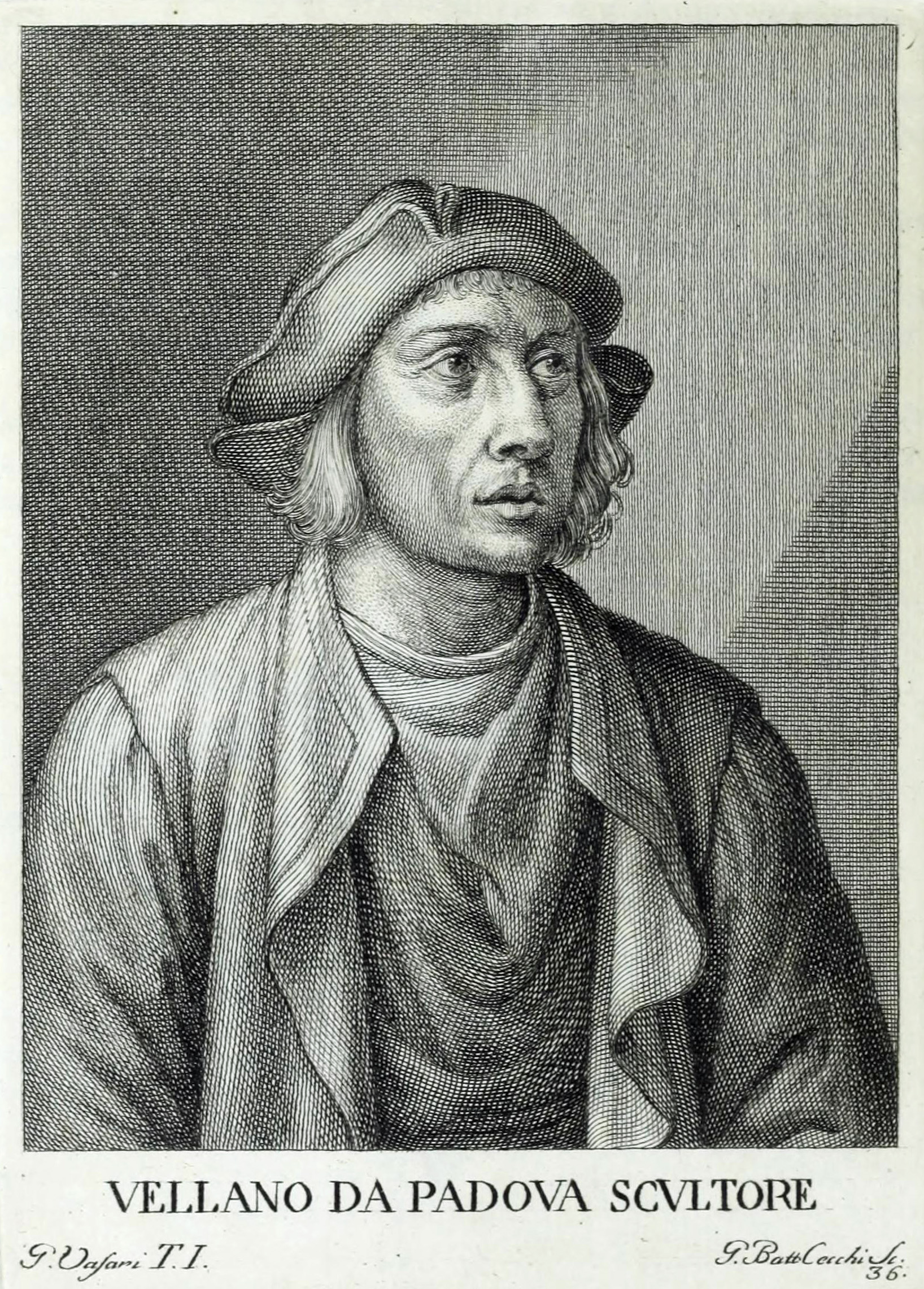
Bartolomeo Bellano

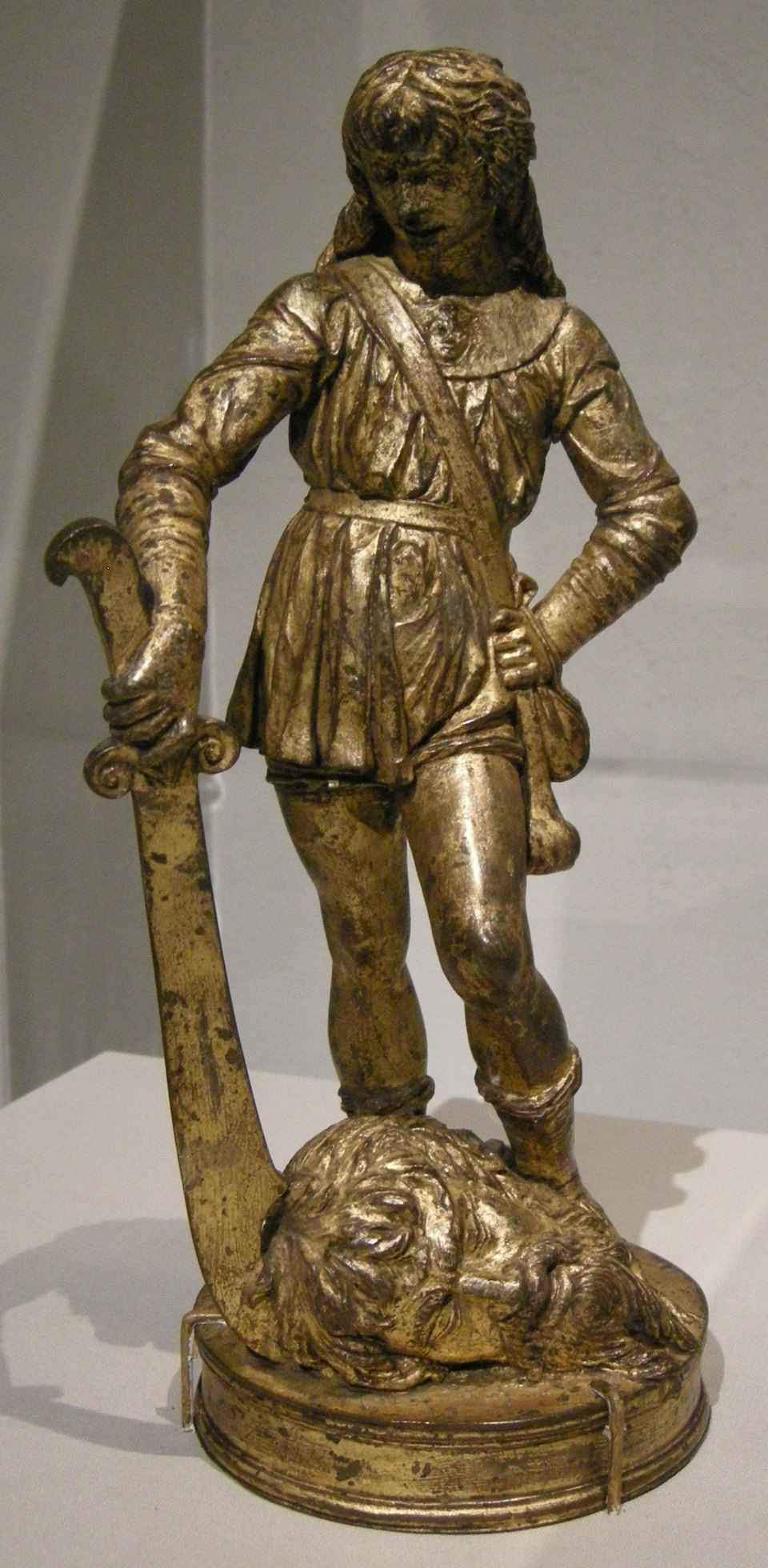
David with the head of Goliath, 1470-1480 ca., Metropolitan Museum

Bartolomeo Bellano, also known as Bartolomeo Vellano, was an Italian Renaissance sculptor and architect who was born in Padua in 1437 or 1438. He was the son of a goldsmith and became a student of the sculptor Donatello, with whom he worked on many projects, including in the Basilica of Saint Anthony of Padua.

Bartolomeo Bellano’s earliest documented works are four terracotta relief sculptures of boys, which were commissioned about 1460. One of which is held by the Musée des Beaux-Arts in Lyon. He created a statue of Pope Paul II in Perugia in 1467.

Among his students was the sculptor and architect Andrea Riccio. Riccio imitated Bellano's Europa and the Bull sculpture.

Bartolomeo died in Padua in either 1496 or 1497.

== Bibliography ==
- Dizionario biografico degli Italiani, Rome, Istituto della enciclopedia italiana, 1960.
- Thieme, Ulrich and Felix Becker, editors, Allgemeines Lexikon der bildenden Künstler von der Antike bis zur Gegenwart, Reprint of 1907 edition, Leipzig, Veb E.A. Seemann Verlag, 1980-1986.
- Vasari, Giorgio, Le Vite delle più eccellenti pittori, scultori, ed architettori, many editions and translations.
