= Andrea Riccio =

Italian sculptor and architect

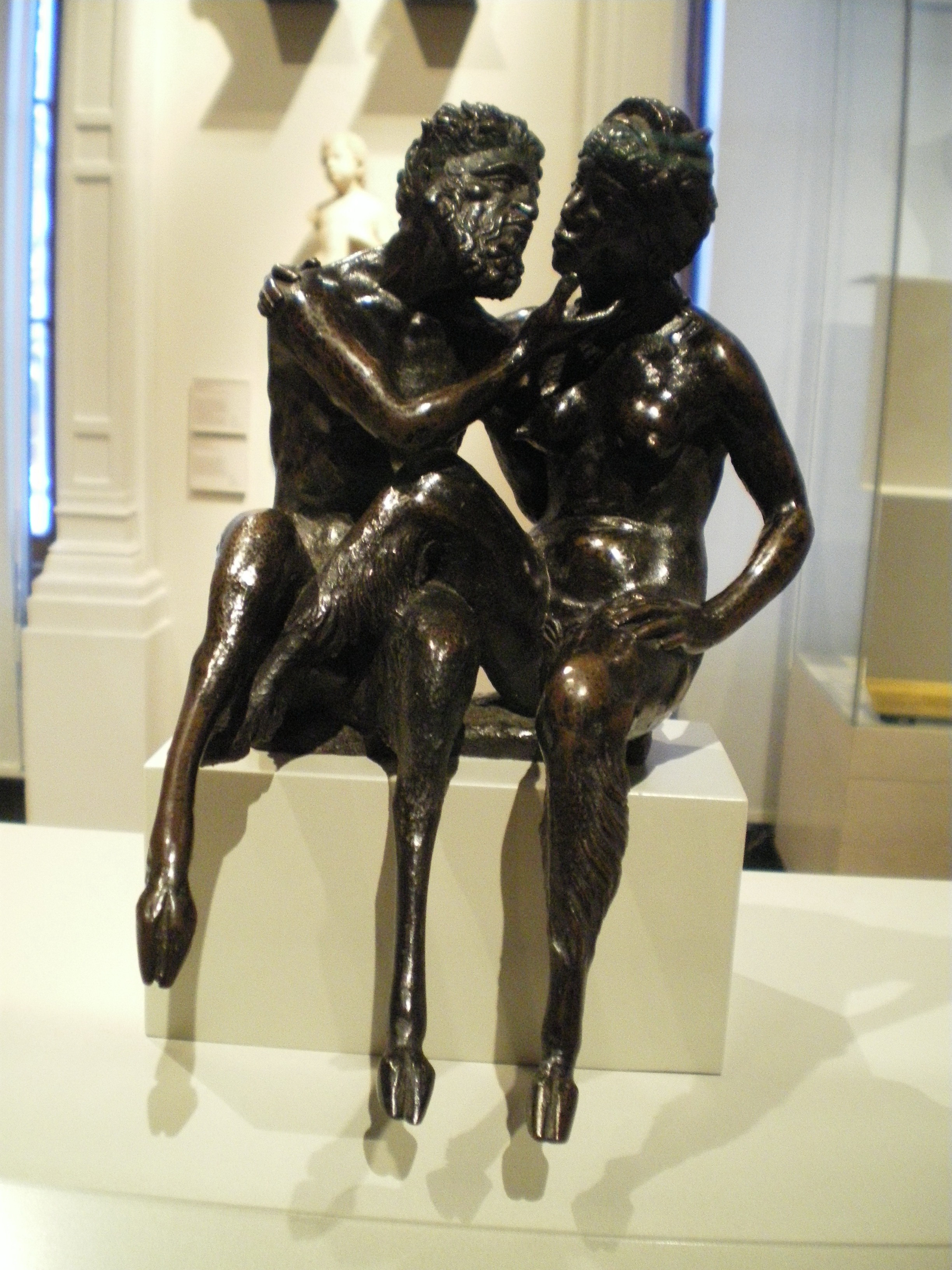
Satyr and Satyress, about 1510-1520, Victoria and Albert Museum

Andrea Riccio (c. 1470 – 1532) was an Italian sculptor and occasional architect, whose real name was Andrea Briosco, but is usually known by his sobriquet meaning "curly"; he is also known as Il Riccio and Andrea Crispus ("curly" in Latin). He is mainly known for small bronzes, often practical objects such as inkwells, door knockers or fire-dogs, exquisitely sculpted and decorated in a classicising Renaissance style.

He was born in Padua and first trained as a goldsmith by his father, Ambrogio di Cristoforo Briosco. He later began to study bronze casting under Bartolomeo Bellano, a pupil of Donatello. As an architect, he is known for the church of Santa Giustina in his native city. His masterpieces are the bronze Paschal candelabrum in the choir of the Basilica of Sant'Antonio at Padua (1515), and the two bronze reliefs (1507) of David dancing before the Ark and Judith and Holofernes in the same church. His bronze and marble tomb of the physician Girolamo della Torre in the church of San Fermo at Verona was beautifully decorated with reliefs, which were taken away by the French and are now in the Louvre. His smaller, easily transportable, works appealed to collectors across Europe. A bronze lamp made by Riccio was a longtime possession of the Rothschild family, and is now in the collection of the Metropolitan Museum of Art.

== Selected works ==
- Rothschild Lamp
- Shouting horseman
