= Ca' d'Oro =

Palace and art gallery in Venice, Italy

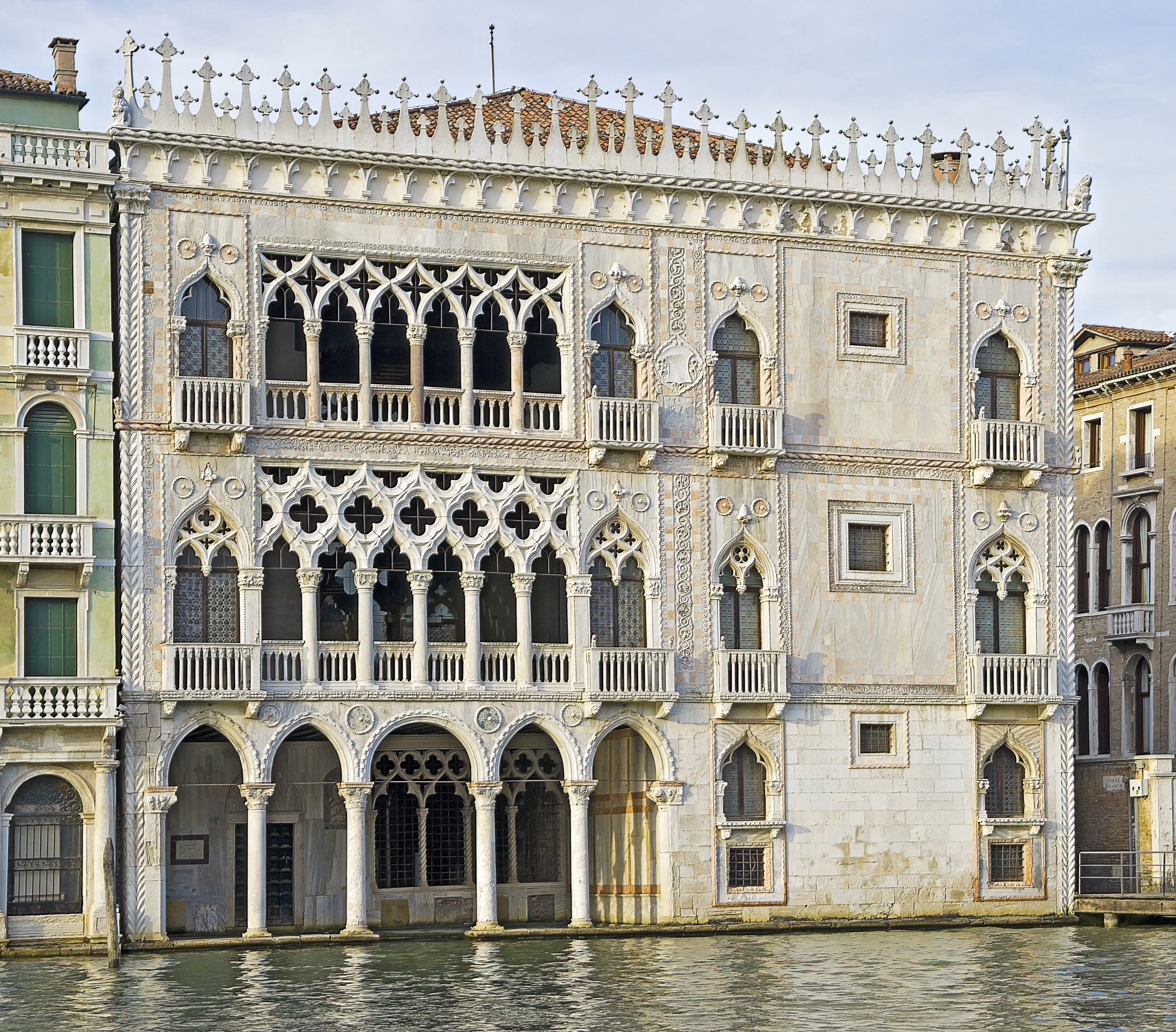
- Ca' d'Oro façade overlooking the Grand Canal
- Click on the map for a fullscreen view
- Alternative names: Galleria Giorgio Franchetti

General information
- Type: Originally a palace; now a museum
- Architectural style: Byzantine, Gothic, Islamic
- Location: Venice, Veneto, Cannaregio 3932 (Calle Ca 'd'Oro), Italy
- Coordinates: 45°26′26″N 12°20′02″E
- Construction started: 1421
- Completed: 1437
- Owner: Original patron: Marino Contarini

Design and construction
- Architects: Giovanni Bon, Bartolomeo Bon, Matteo Raverti

Website
- https://www.cadoro.org/the-museum/?lang=en

The Ca' d'Oro, or Palazzo Santa Sofia, is a palace on the Grand Canal in Venice, northern Italy. Ca' d'Oro or Cadoro translates to "House of Gold" or "Golden House" in English because of the gilt and polychrome external decorations that once adorned its walls. It was designed by Marino Contarini and later restored by Baron Giorgio Franchetti. In 1927, the building was converted into a museum and since then has been known as the Galleria Giorgio Franchetti alla Ca' d'Oro.

The Ca' d'Oro has long been regarded as the best-surviving palazzo in Venetian Gothic architecture, retaining all the most characteristic features, despite some losses. On the facade, the loggia-like window group of closely spaced small columns, with heavy tracery and quatrefoil openings above, use the formula from the Doge's Palace that had become iconic. There is also Byzantine-inspired decoration along the roofline and patterning in fancy colored stone to the flat wall surfaces. The smaller windows show a variety of forms with an ogee arch capped with a relief ornament.

== Patron and commission ==
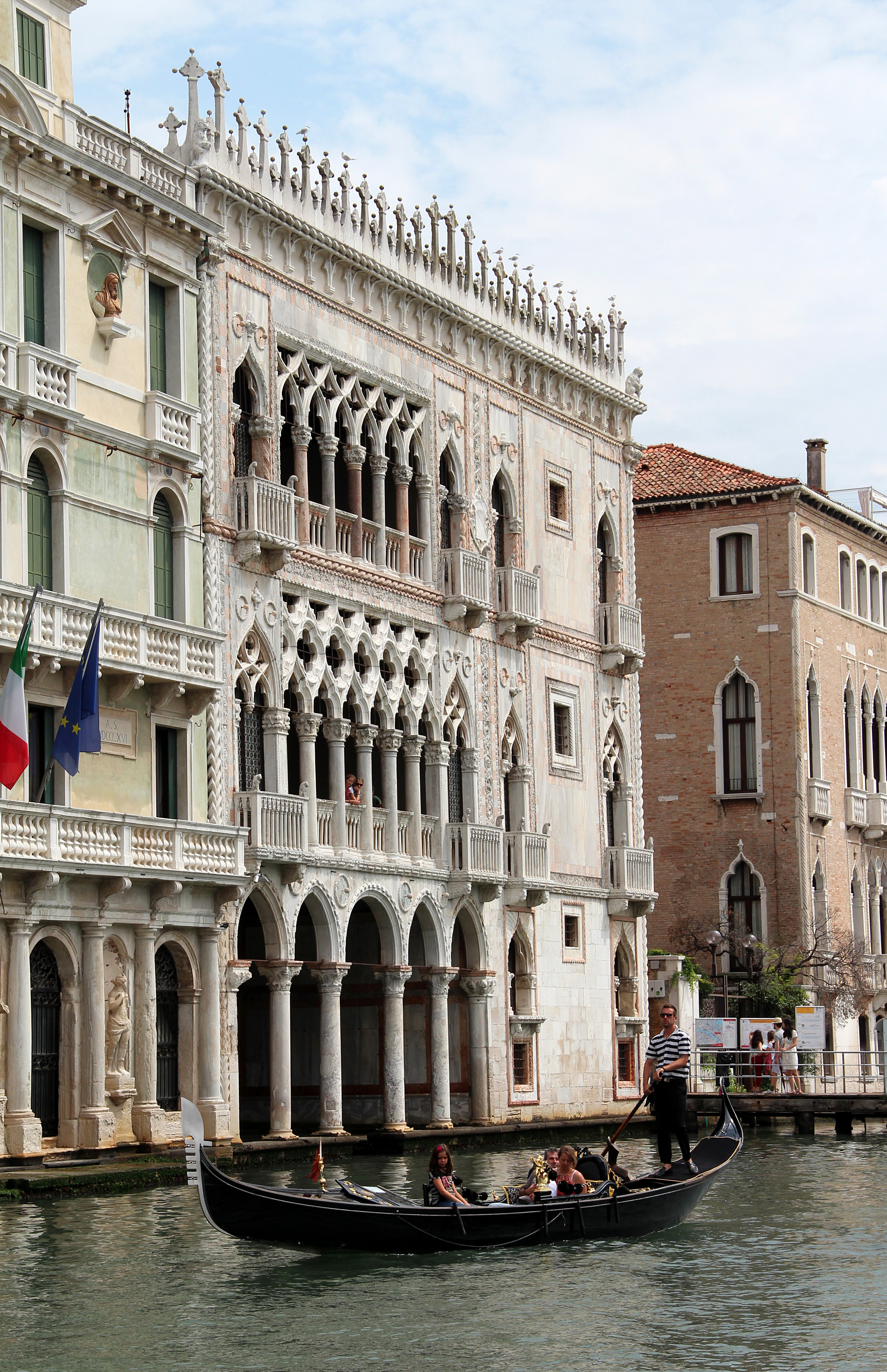
Gondolier sailing in front of the Ca'd'Oro.

The patron of the building was Marino Contarini of a noble Venetian family who had provided eight different Doges between 1043 and 1676. Marino Contarini used the building of the Ca' d'Oro, as a way to assert his family's position in Venetian society. This message was also conveyed as the palace was built not far from the Rialto Bridge on the left bank of Grand Canal of Venice, which was and remains the main thoroughfare in Venice. The architects of the Ca d'Oro were Giovanni Bon and his son Bartolomeo Bon.

The Ca' d'Oro was built between 1421 and 1437 for Marino Contarini upon the foundations of a building that he had received through his marriage to Soradamore Zeno, which had been part of an old palace belonging to the Zeno family. As the patron of the new palace, Contarini was in essence the building's main designer, as he was the one who oversaw the entire project. He also kept notes and accounts of the whole process, which have survived throughout the centuries, offering scholars amazing insight into the building's construction.

=== Architects ===
He contracted two main architects to execute his plan for the palace: the Venetian architect and sculptor Giovanni Bon(along with his son Bartolomeo Bon), and another architect-sculptor, Matteo Raverti, who came from Milan. Matteo Raverti's notable contributions to the Ca' d'Oro include the tracery of the main loggia and the ogee-arched tympanum over the land entrance. Giovanni Bon and Bartolomeo Bon are also known for their contribution to the main ceremonial door of the Doge's Palace, the so-called Porta della Carta, but was called Porta Aurea because of how much gold they had added. Matteo Raverti was also known for his work as a sculptor for the Milan Cathedral.

== Description and layout ==
One of the Ca' d'Oro's distinguishing features is its asymmetrical facade, designed to maximize light in rooms where side windows were impractical due to the proximity of neighboring buildings.

The building's atrium (androne)—a large open hall located near the waterfront—is accessed directly from the canal through the multi-arched loggia. The atrium was historically used for receiving and exporting shipments, reflecting the common practice among noble Venetian families who derived their wealth from trade.

Above the atrium is the gran salone or main reception hall, that occupies the piano nobile (noble floor) and is fronted by the most ornate of the three loggias, featuring intricate Gothic quatrefoil tracery attributed to Matteo Raverti.

The upper stories housed private living quarters for the family. The layout prioritizes privacy and hierarchy, with the family’s private spaces were elevated above the more public reception and trading areas.

The palace has (like other similar buildings in Venice) a small inner courtyard. The neighboring palace is the Palazzo Giustinian Pesaro. The central courtyard is accessible from the gondola landing and provides light and ventilation to the interior spaces. The courtyard contains a central wellhead. Additionally, a small garden area within the courtyard adds to the palace's aesthetic and functional appeal.

== Architectural features of the main façade ==
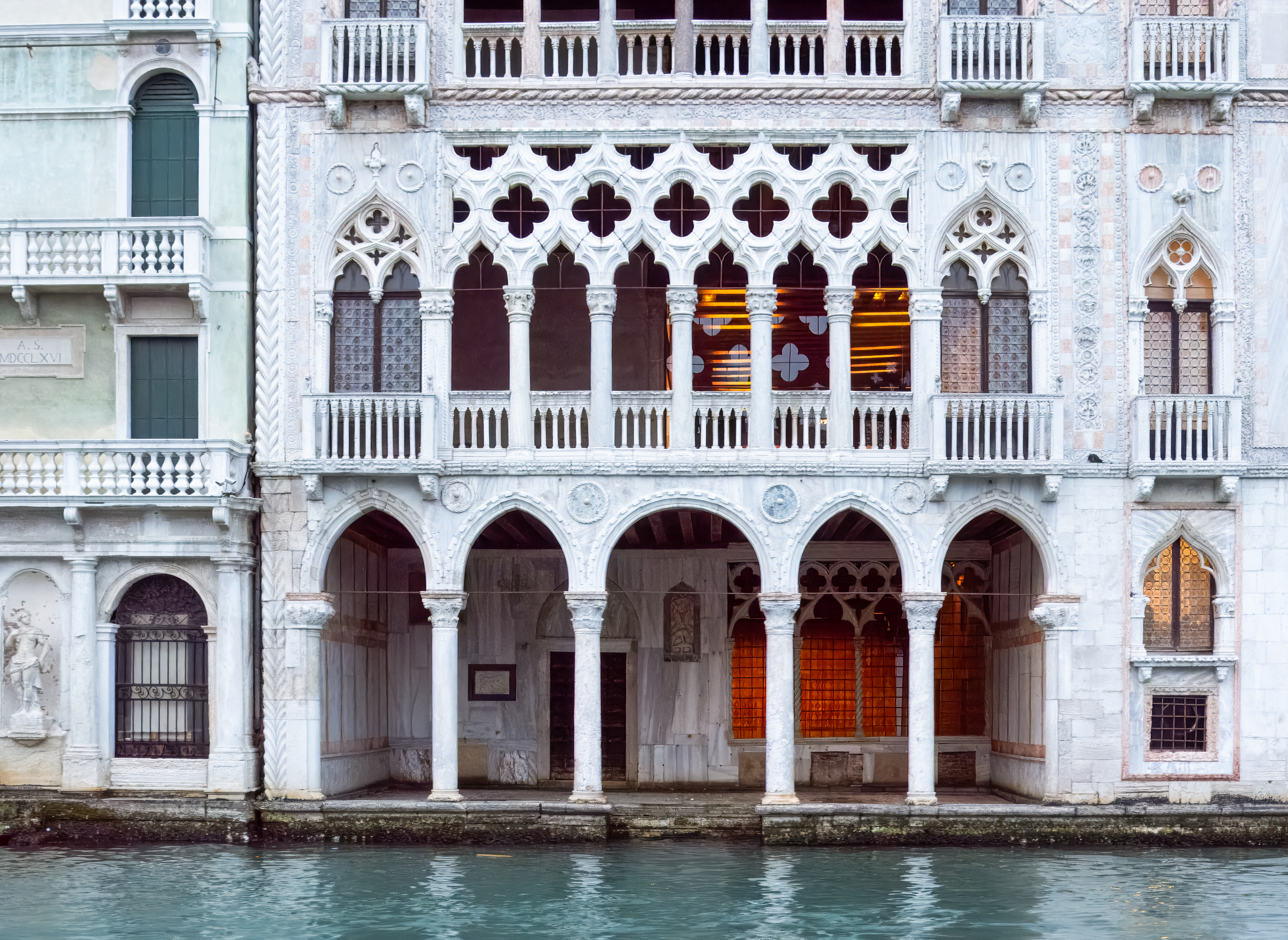
Frontal view of the façade of the Ca' d'Oro

Marino Contarini had the building constructed in the style of Byzantine architecture, mixed with the popular Gothic style of this time, as well as elements of Islamic design. Having for centuries been part of the Byzantine Empire, Venice turned to its Byzantine history, which spanned from the classical period to the more recent medieval era, while Florence, Siena, and Milan called more upon their Greco-Roman traditions.

The facade is divided into three distinct stories: a lower loggia (covered corridor), a middle balcony, and an upper balcony. Other nearby buildings in this style are Palazzo Barbaro and the Palazzo Giustinian. This linear style favoured by the Venetian architects was not superseded by Venetian Renaissance architecture until the end of the 15th century, or later.

The arches, windows, and loggia of the palace provide a variety of decorations that make it one of the most striking palazzo in Venice. Vertical emphasis is created by each level of the façade becoming more ornate as it reaches the top while horizontal emphasis is created by the balustrades on the balconies and the large cornice at the roofline.

Long rows of arches and windows face the canal that provide an abundance of natural lighting in the interior. The lower loggia contains a muti-arched entrance made up of pointed arches that opens up into the canal with a gondola landing. The lower loggia's muti-arched entrance is made up of a central wide arch and a narrower arch flanking each side. The landing leads into a courtyard with a wellhead, stairwell, and a small garden.

On the ground floor, a recessed colonnaded loggia gives access to the entrance hall (portego de mezo) directly from the canal. Above this colonnade is the enclosed balcony of the principal salon on the piano nobile. The columns and arches of this balcony have capitals which in turn support a row of quatrefoil windows; above this balcony is another enclosed balcony or loggia of a similar yet lighter design.

The scalloped cusping of the pointed arches allows for a contrapuntal effect, while the window's tracery patterns on the right side of the palace reflect Gothic elements. The uppermost level contains a row of pinnacles, which are an extension of the quatrefoil patterns below. Made for purely an aesthetic purpose, the balls on each lobe of the pinnacle were covered with golden leaves.

The palazzo got its name from the façade's original use of white and pale red stone with golden gilded accents. Gold was added to the building with Contarini's painter Zoane di Franza in 1431. To enhance the aesthetic appeal, the façade was crafted with stone from Istria that was treated with white lead and oil to create a marble-like sheen, while red Verona marble details were oiled to bring out their rich tonalities. Architectural elements such as the parapet balls, window finials, capitals, and moldings were all gilded, adding to the luxurious appearance. This combination of practical design and opulent decoration underscores the dual purpose of the Ca' d'Oro as both a functional space and a display of wealth and status. Over time, sun exposure dulled the white and pale red stone has worn away and the facade's gilded elements are no longer evident. In fact, by 1600, no more gold decoration remained on the exterior, but with the palace's golden façade was already so well-known that it retained the title of Ca' d'Oro.

== Restoration ==
The restoration of the Ca' d'Oro was led by Baron Giorgio Franchetti until his death on December 17, 1923. Franchetti was greatly attuned to detail and wanted to duplicate the technique of the previous accomplished architects. This led him to entrust Ferdinando Forlati with assisting with this restoration, and Forlati was the one to assume leadership of the project after Franchetti's death. Forlati's assistant, Antonio Nardo, was also entrusted with this task by Franchetti, who requested that Nardo be recognized with the title of Conservator of the Ca' d'Oro.

During his time working on the restoration of the building, Giorgio Franchetti was able to restore parts removed under the ownership of Marie Taglioni. These pieces notably included the red Verona marble well-head that was sculpted by Bartolomeo Bon. Franchetti also took it upon himself to compose the mosaic pavement in the entrance hall that was made out of Grecian marble and red marble from Verona. Along with these features, he also had the walls individually and uniquely carved. Although the ground floor was originally used for utilitarian function, Franchetti had marble facing added that concealed this role. Along with his project of restorating of the Ca' d'Oro, Baron Giorgio Franchetti donated the building to the public in 1916 and it was converted into a museum (see Provenance section below).

== Provenance ==
Following the fall of the Venetian Republic in 1797, the palace changed ownership several times. In 1846, Alessandro Trubetzkoi purchased the palace, which was in a ruinous state. Trubetzkoi gifted the palace to ballet dancer Marie Taglioni, who sold notable architectural features from the building.

Franchetti would also restore the palace after the reckless renovation of the architect, Trubetzkoi, which resulted in his imprisonment under charges of vandalism. In the end, many of the Gothic features, including the stairway of the inner courtyard and the balconies which overlooked the courtyard, were removed.

In 1894, the palace was acquired by its last owner, baron Giorgio Franchetti. Some of the architectural elements that had been sold by Marie Taglioni were recovered by Franchetti, such as the red Verona marble wellhead by Bartolomeo Bon.

Throughout his lifetime, he amassed an important art collection and personally oversaw its extensive restoration, including the reconstruction of the stairway and the Cosmatesque courtyard with ancient marble. In 1916, Franchetti bequeathed the Ca' d'Oro to the Italian State. It is now open to the public as a gallery: Galleria Giorgio Franchetti alla Ca' d'Oro.

== Museum ==
The gallery houses the collection of works of art collected by Giorgio Franchetti in his life. Following the donation to the Italian State in 1916 and in preparation for the museum, the Franchetti collection was accompanied by some state collections from which most of the bronzes and sculptures on display come from, as well as numerous Venetian and Flemish paintings.

Among the most valuable works are the San Sebastiano by Andrea Mantegna and the Portrait of Marcello Durazzo by Antoon van Dyck.

In addition to the exhibition rooms, the museum houses various laboratories for the conservation and restoration of works of art.

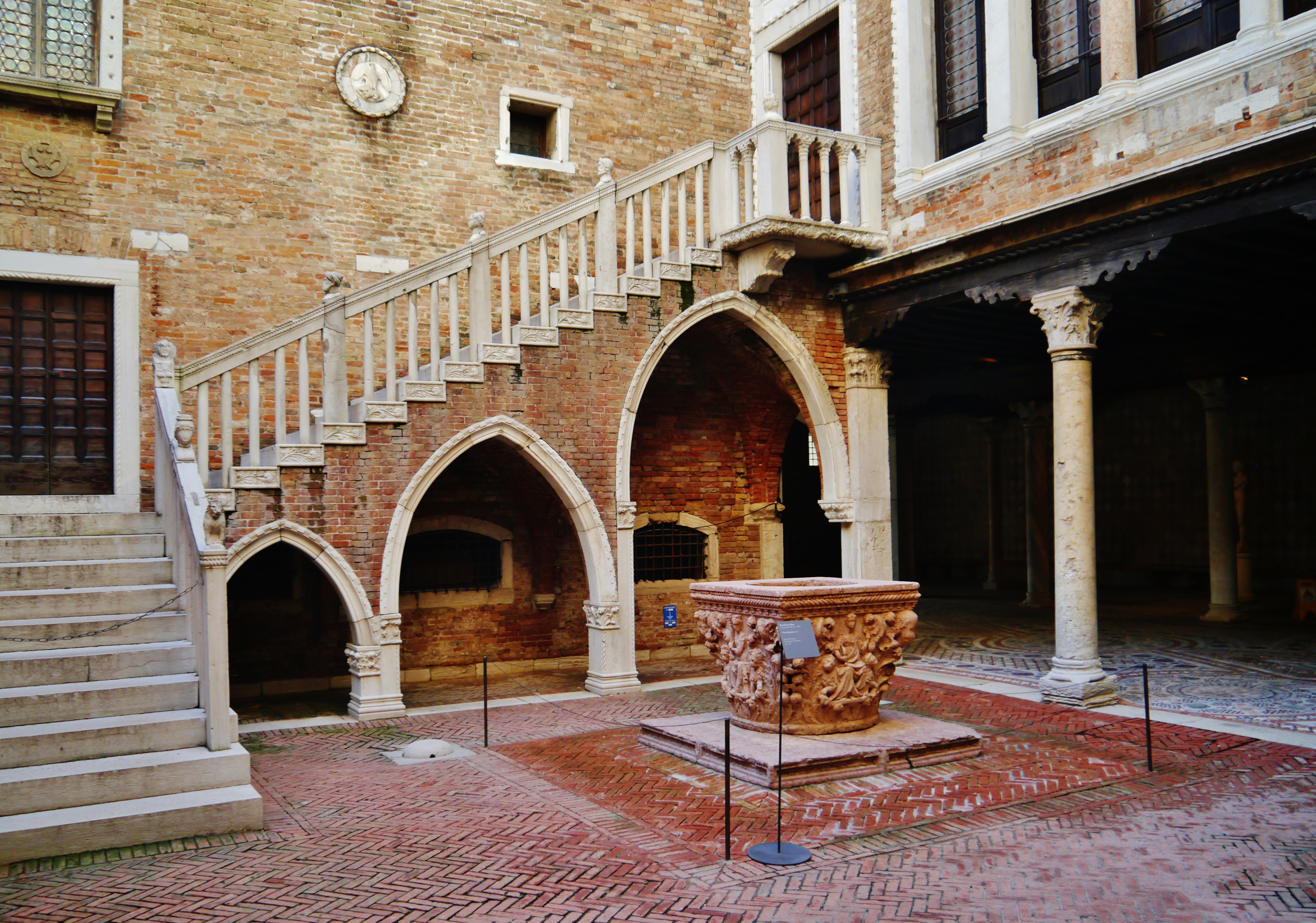
The courtyard

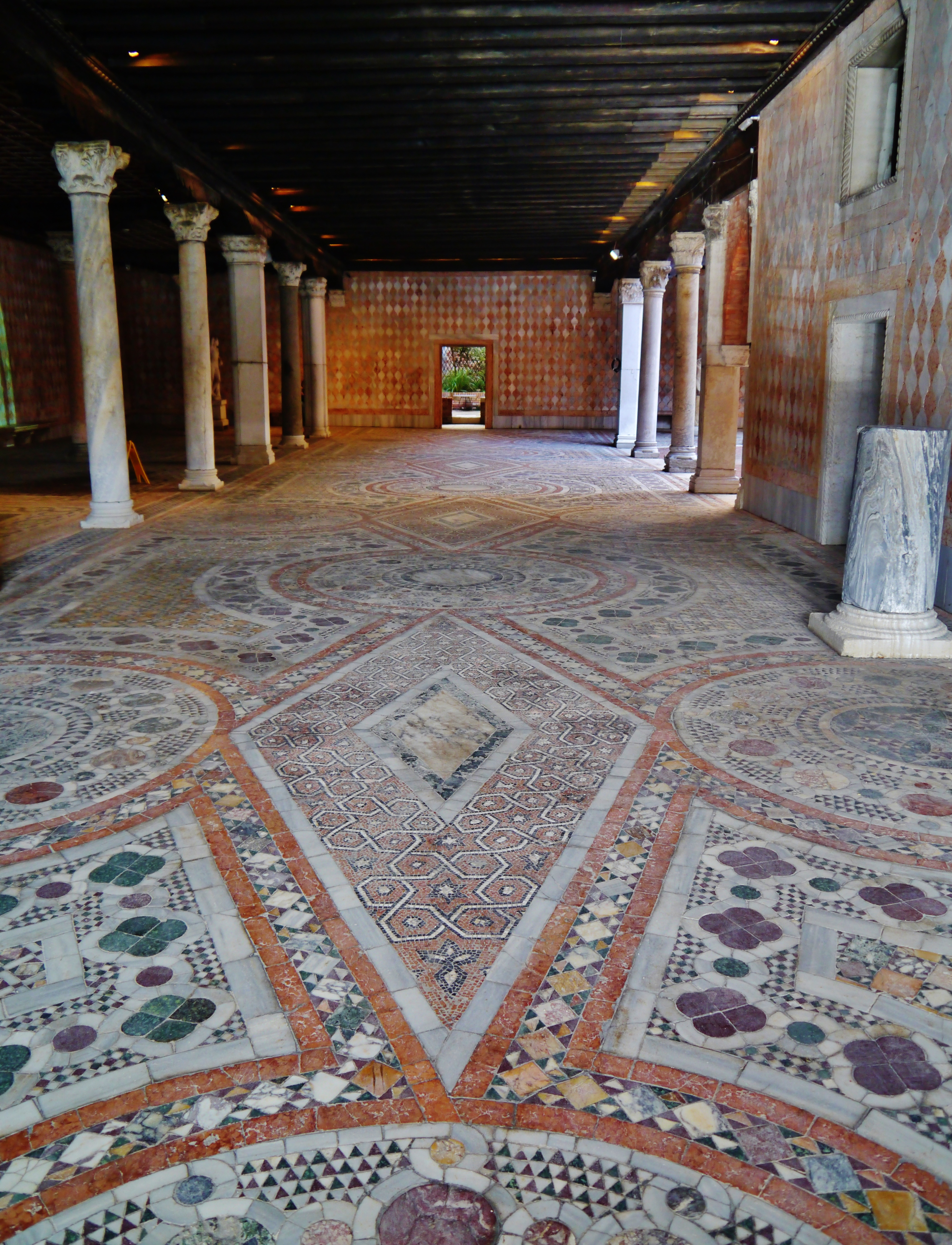
Cosmatesque floor in the portego

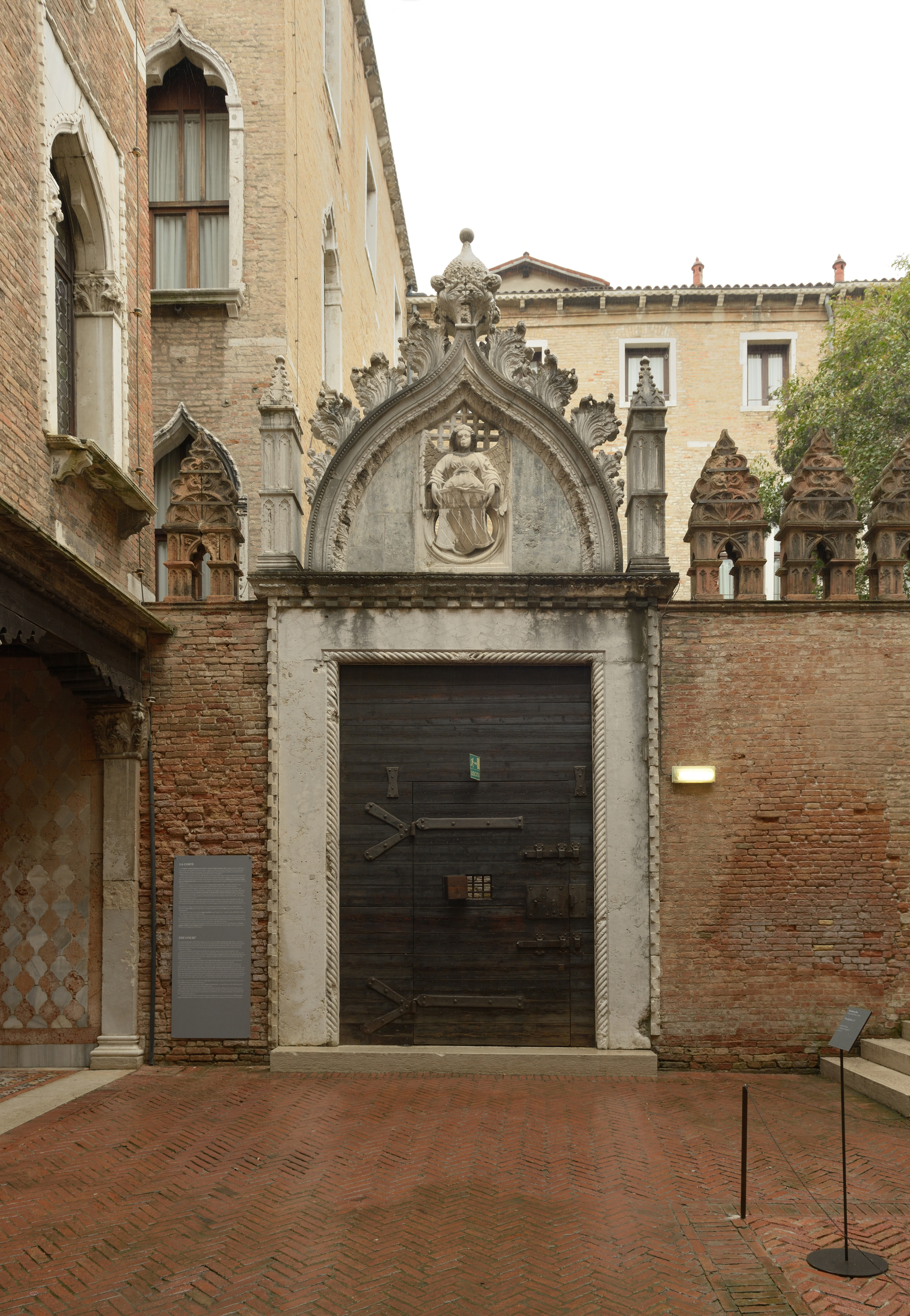
Rear doorway, to the street

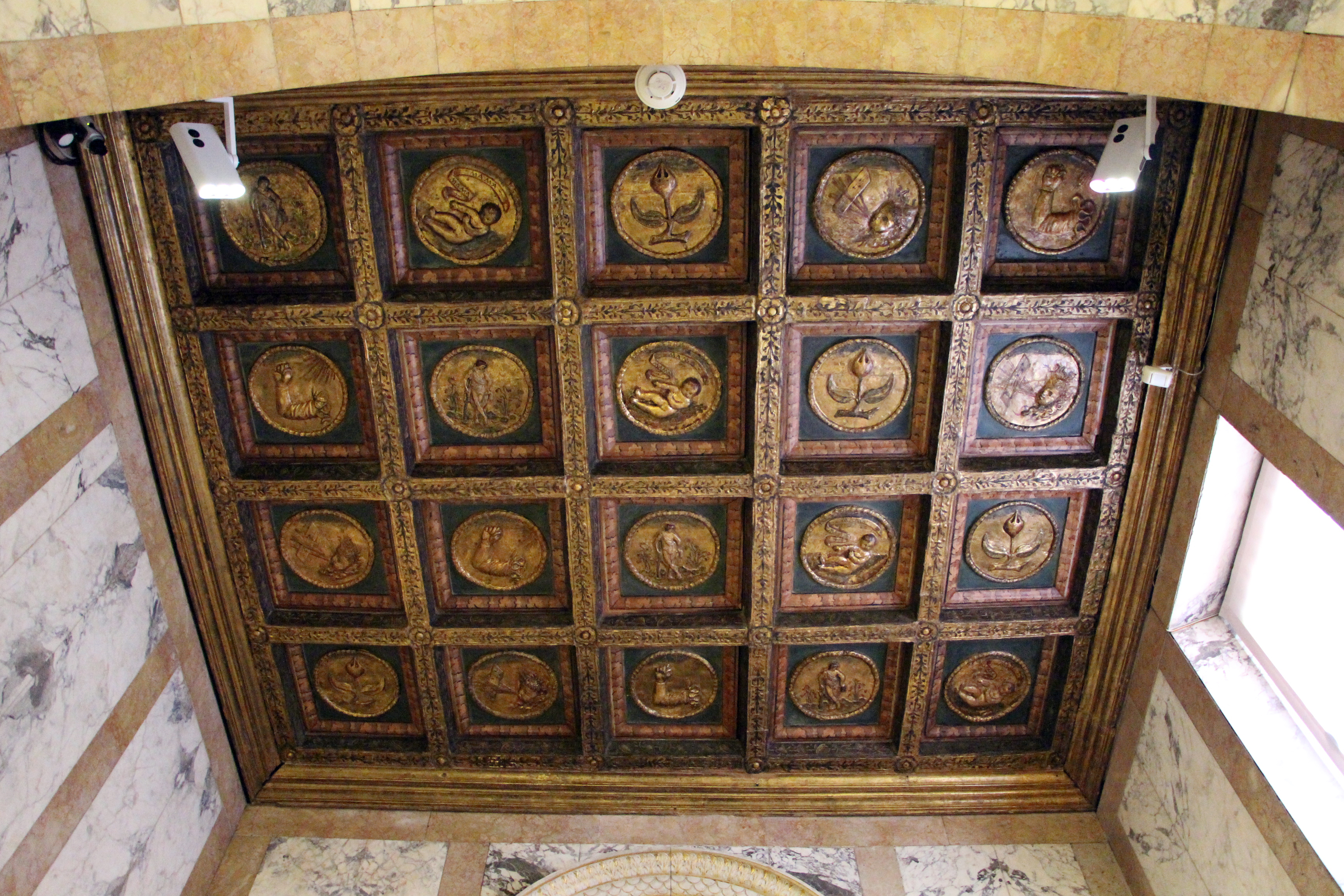
15th-century ceiling

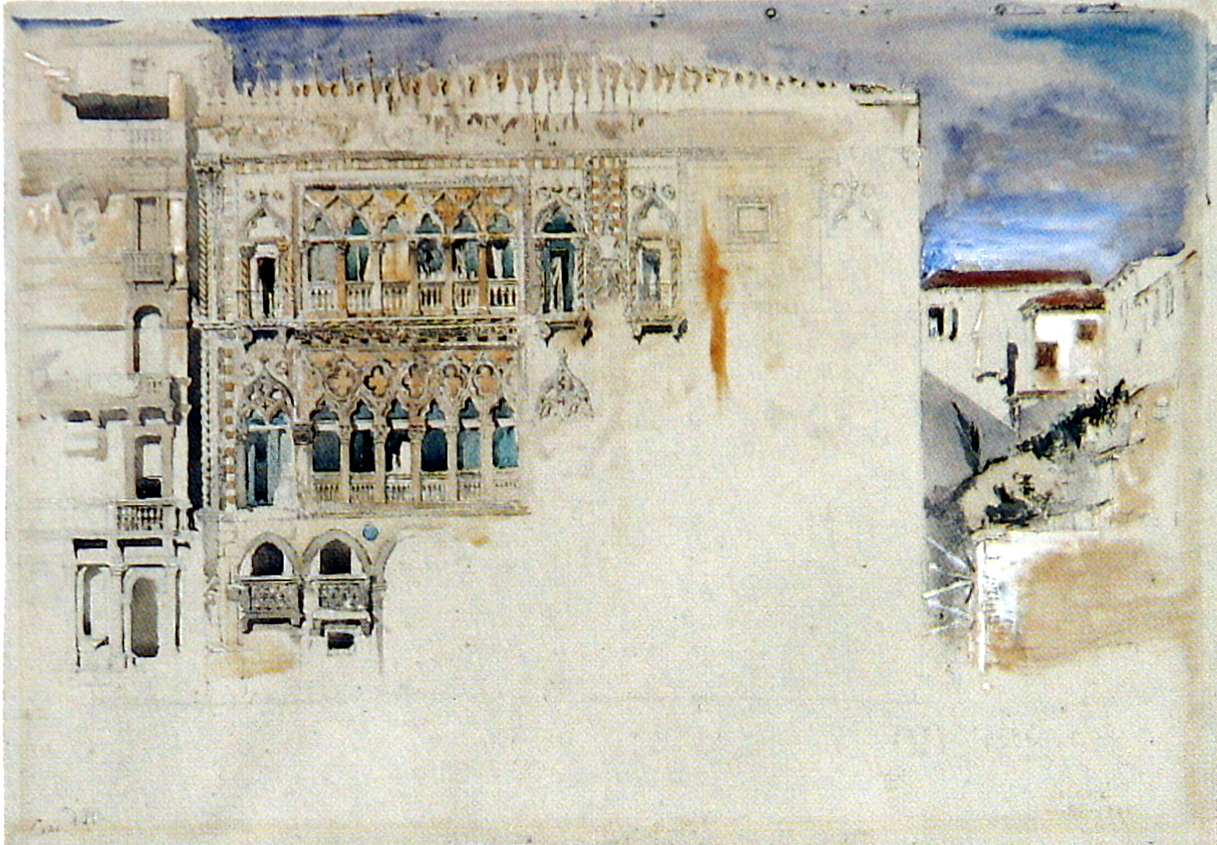
Pencil and watercolour by John Ruskin. (1845)

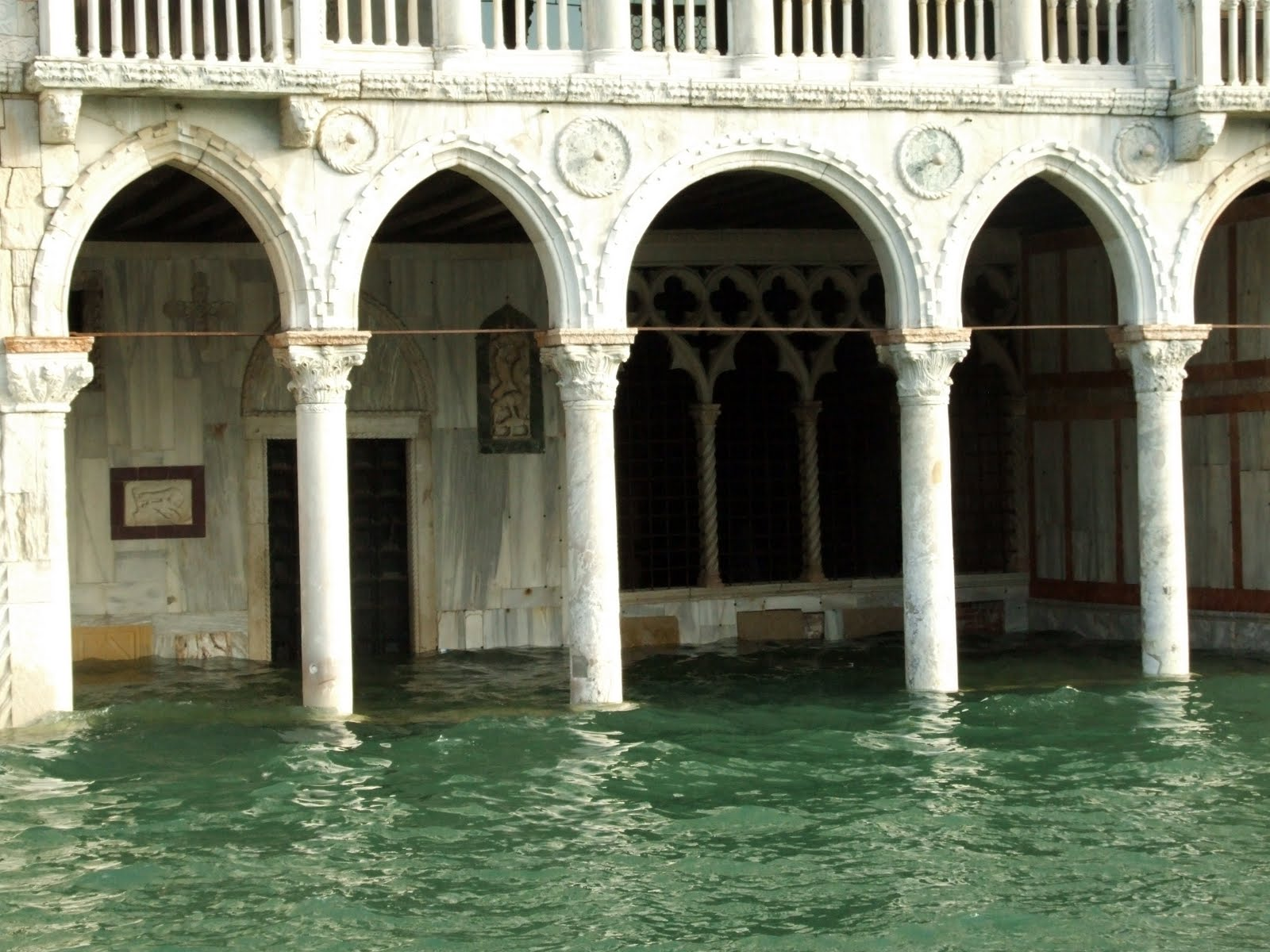
Canal entrance during a flood

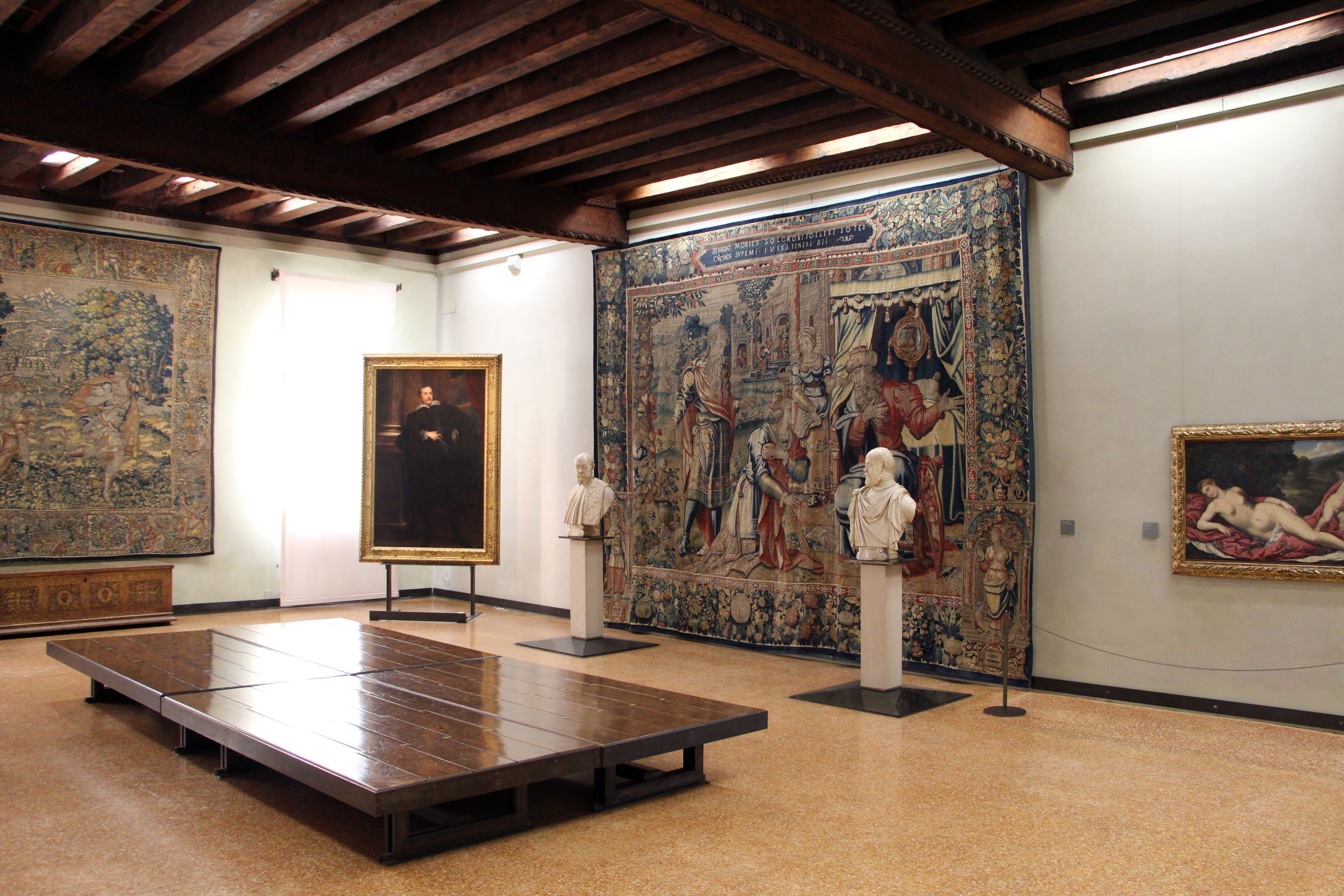
An exhibition hall on the second floor of the building

== See also ==
- List of buildings and structures in Venice

== Bibliography ==
- Goy, Richard J. (1992). The House of Gold. Cambridge.
- Arslan, Edoardo (1979). Venezia gotica: l'architettura civile gotica veneziana. Milano: Electa. pp. 225–237.
- Brusegan, Marcello (2007). I Palazzi di Venezia. Roma: Newton & Compton. pp. 275–279. ISBN 978-88-541-0820-2.
- Fasolo, Andrea (2003). Palazzi di Venezia. Arsenale editrice. pp. 16–21. ISBN 978-88-7743-295-7.
- Fiore, Francesco Paolo (1998). Storia dell'architettura italiana: il Quattrocento. Milano: Electa. pp. 200–241.
- Fogolari, Gino (1936). Regia galleria Giorgio Franchetti alla ca' d'Oro di Venezia. Roma: La Libreria dello Stato.
- Moschini Marconi, Sandra (1992). Galleria G. Franchetti alla ca'd'Oro: Venezia. Roma: Istituto poligrafico e Zecca dello Stato.
- Tourmann, Inga. Venezia: Leggi e ascolta. Hamburg: Jourist Verlags GmbH. ISBN 978-3-89-894504-2.

Preceded by Bridge of Sighs	Venice landmarks Ca' d'Oro	Succeeded by Ca' Foscari
