= Miracle of the Relic of the Cross at the Ponte di Rialto =

Painting by Vittore Carpaccio

Miracle of the Cross at the Ponte di Rialto
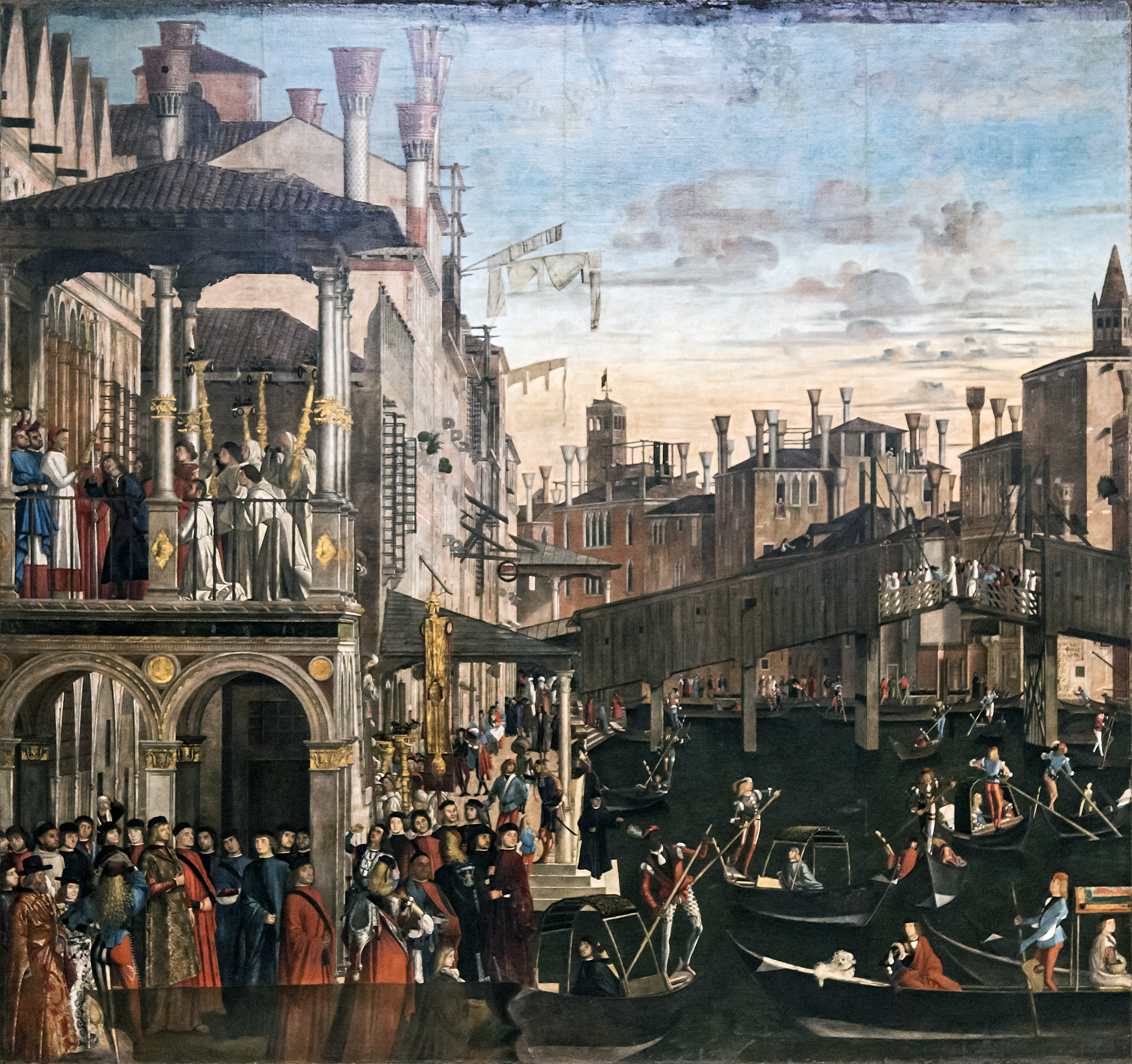
- Artist: Vittore Carpaccio
- Year: c. 1496
- Medium: Tempera on canvas
- Dimensions: 371 cm × 392 cm (146 in × 154 in)
- Location: Gallerie dell'Accademia; Venice

The Miracle of the Cross at the Ponte di Rialto (Italian: Miracolo della Croce a Rialto), also known as The Healing of the Madman, is a painting by the Italian Renaissance artist Vittore Carpaccio, dating from c. 1496. It is in the Gallerie dell'Accademia in Venice, Italy.

== History ==
The painting was commissioned for the Grand Hall of the Scuola Grande di San Giovanni Evangelista, the seat of the eponymous brotherhood in Venice. The commission included a total of nine large canvasses by prominent artists of the time, including Gentile Bellini, Perugino, Vittore Carpaccio, Giovanni Mansueti, Lazzaro Bastiani and Benedetto Rusconi.

The subject of the paintings was to be the miracles of a fragment of the True Cross. The item had been donated to the brotherhood by Philippe de Mézières (or Filippo Maser), chancellor of the Kingdom of Cyprus and Jerusalem in 1369, and soon became the object of veneration in the city.

The canvasses were all executed between 1496–1501. All survive today, aside from that by Perugino, and were donated to the Gallerie dell'Accademia in 1820 after the fall of the Venetian Republic and end of the Napoleonic suppressions.

In December 2019, conservation treatment sponsored by the non-profit organization Save Venice Inc. was undertaken in order to remove surface dirt, old varnish, discolored inpainting and residue left from earlier 19th-century treatments.

== Description ==
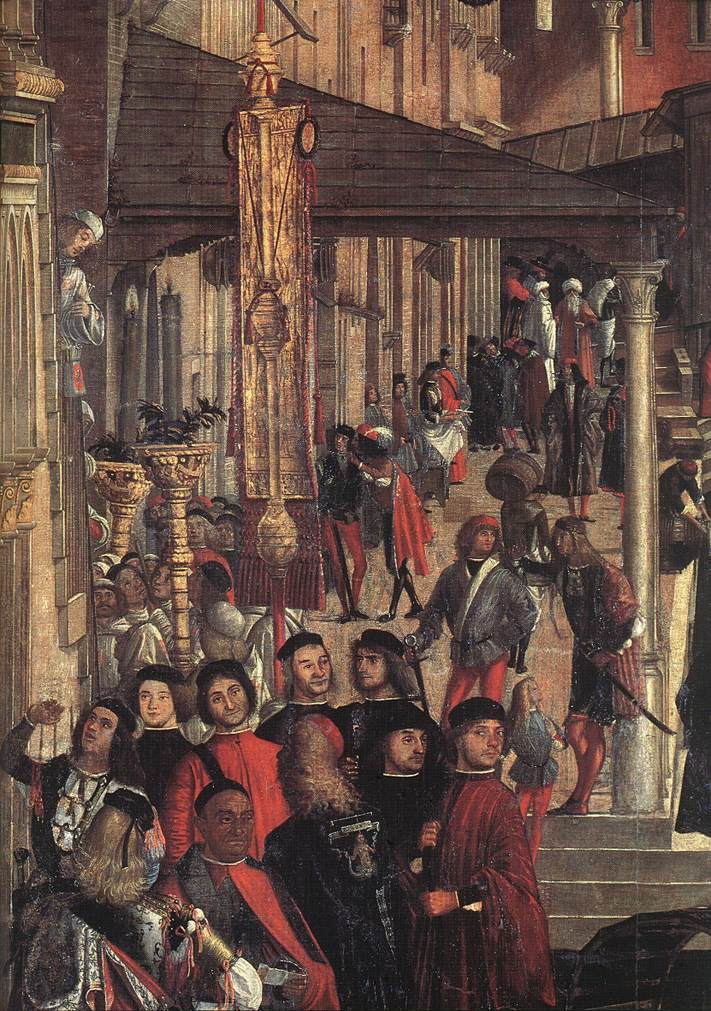
Detail

The painting depicts the miracle of the healing of a madman through a relic of the Holy Cross, held by the Patriarch of Grado Francesco Querini, which took place in the Palazzo a San Silvestro on the Canal Grande, near the Rialto Bridge. The scene has an asymmetrical composition, with a cluster of figures in the left foreground and behind them, the façades of the buildings along the canal. These structures feature the typical inverted cone chimneys of medieval Venice.

The miraculous event itself is relegated to a wide loggia in the upper left corner: most of the canvas is occupied by a veduta with a great number of characters and naturalistic features. The people include a group of pedestrians walking ahead of the religious procession following the relic. The bridge depicted is wooden, as it was before its collapse in 1524. Like the current version (dating from 1591), this bridge was flanked by a double row of shops and, at its midpoint was fitted with a movable boardwalk to allow the passage of taller vessels along the canalway.

Shown at right is the 15th-century construction of the Fondaco dei Tedeschi, later destroyed by a fire in January 1505. Other notable architectural features include the bell tower of San Giovanni Crisostomo, the portico of Ca' da Mosto and the bell tower of Santi Apostoli before its reconstruction in 1672.

Details of human activities include private gondolas used as ferries, the presence of numerous foreigners with eastern-style garments, women cleaning carpets, and workers emptying their barrels.

== See also ==
- Procession in St. Mark's Square
- Miracle of the Cross at the Bridge of S. Lorenzo
- 100 Great Paintings, 1980 BBC series

== Sources ==
- De Vecchi, Pierluigi; Elda Cerchiari (1999). I tempi dell'arte. Milan: Bompiani. ISBN 88-451-7212-0.
