= Portrait of the Vendramin Family =

Painting by Titian

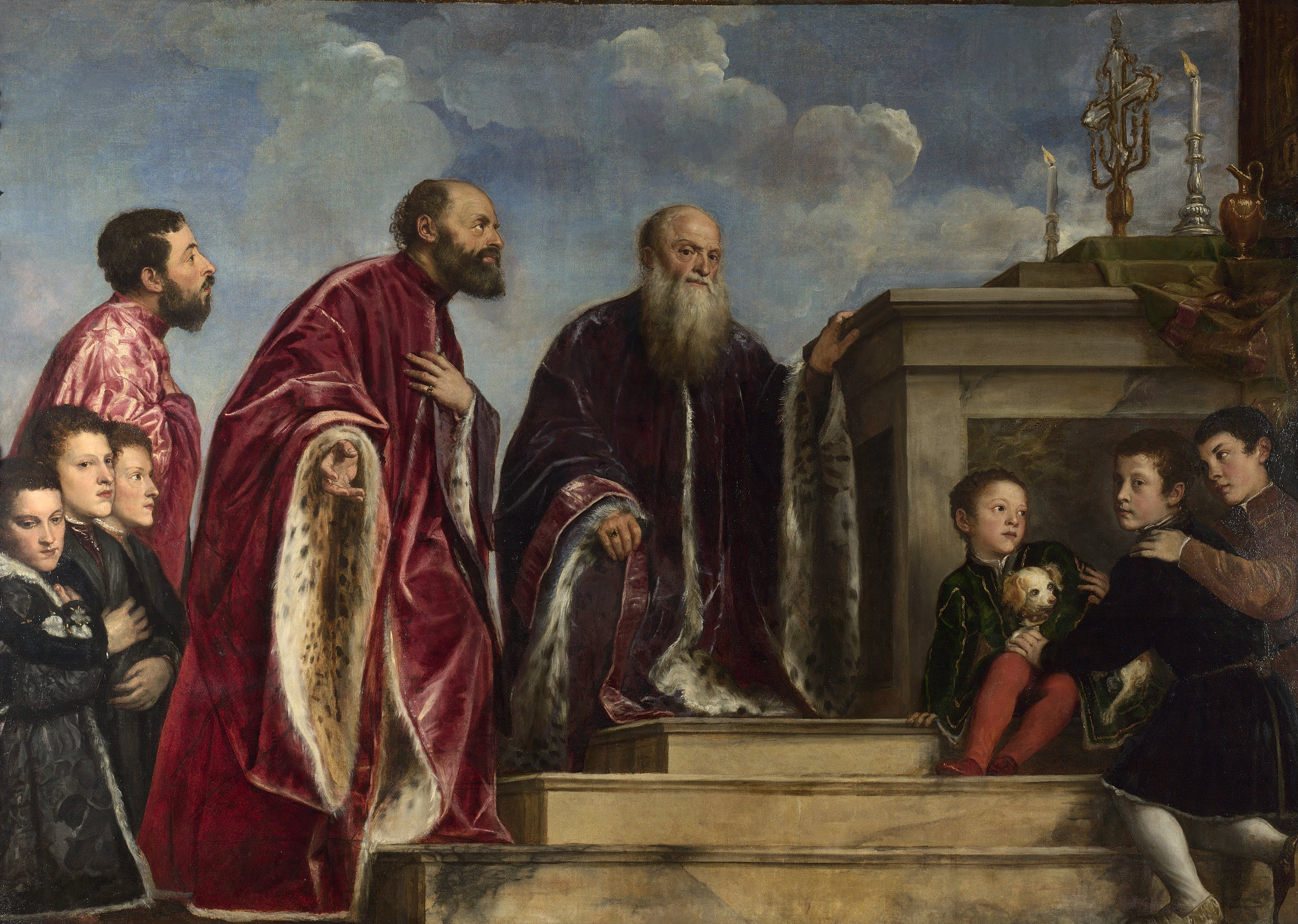
- Artist: Titian
- Year: Early 1540s
- Medium: Oil on canvas
- Dimensions: 185 cm × 202 cm (73 in × 80 in)
- Location: National Gallery, London

The Portrait of the Vendramin Family, also known as The Vendramin Family Venerating a Relic of the True Cross, is a large painting by the 16th century Venetian master Titian and his workshop, executed in the early 1540s. It is now in the National Gallery, in London.

== History and description ==
The canvas was commissioned by the patrician Vendramin family, and portrays, as was the typical Venetian custom, only male members of the dynasty. It includes the brothers Andrea and Gabriele Vendramin, and Andrea's seven sons. However Andrea was apparently only three years older than Gabriele, which one would not think from the two figures here. It remains uncertain which is which. The three young boys kneeling on the left were added later by another artist, and are markedly lower in quality.

The figures are next to an altar holding a reliquary of the True Cross, which still exists. This was connected with a miracle in 1370-82 depicted by Vittorio Carpaccio, Gentile Bellini and other artists - when accidentally dropped into a canal during a congested procession it did not sink but hovered over the water, evading others trying to help, until an earlier Andrea Vendramin dived in and retrieved it. This Andrea had been presented with the relic in 1369, in his capacity as head of the confraternity or Scuola Grande di San Giovanni Evangelista; they still hold the relic and its reliquary. Both the large Bellini painting, The Miracle of the True Cross near San Lorenzo Bridge, of 1496–1500, and the Carpaccio of 1494, are now in the Accademia museum in Venice.

Titian's painting has been described as, "one of the greatest group portraits in history". It balances youth and wisdom as well as demonstrating the power of this family and their public commitments to the Republic. The relic is a central part of the portrait and was seen as both a symbol of the Serene Republic, and a personal symbol for the Vendramin family.

The painting was clearly designed for a specific location, presumably in one of the various Vendramin palaces in Venice, perhaps on a stairway. The lighting and very low vanishing point suggest that the primary viewing point was anticipated to be at the left of the canvas, with the lower edge at about head height.

== History ==
This painting remained in Venice until at least 1636 when it was bought by Anthony van Dyck who was painter at the court of Charles I. After his death it was claimed as the property of Lady Anne Middleton by her son, Sir John Wittewronge. After claiming possession Sir John sold the painting to Algernon Percy, 10th Earl of Northumberland, one of Van Dyck's major patrons, and passed by descent through the Earls and Dukes of Northumberland and Somerset until 1929, when it was bought by the National Gallery. At some point it has been cut down on both sides and at the bottom.

== See also ==
- List of works by Titian

== Sources ==
- Gould, Cecil (1975). The Sixteenth Century Italian Schools. London: National Gallery Catalogues. ISBN 0-947645-22-5.
- Penny, Nicholas, National Gallery Catalogues (new series): The Sixteenth Century Italian Paintings, Volume II, Venice 1540–1600, 2008, National Gallery Publications Ltd, ISBN 1857099133
