= Procession in St. Mark's Square =

Painting by Gentile Bellini

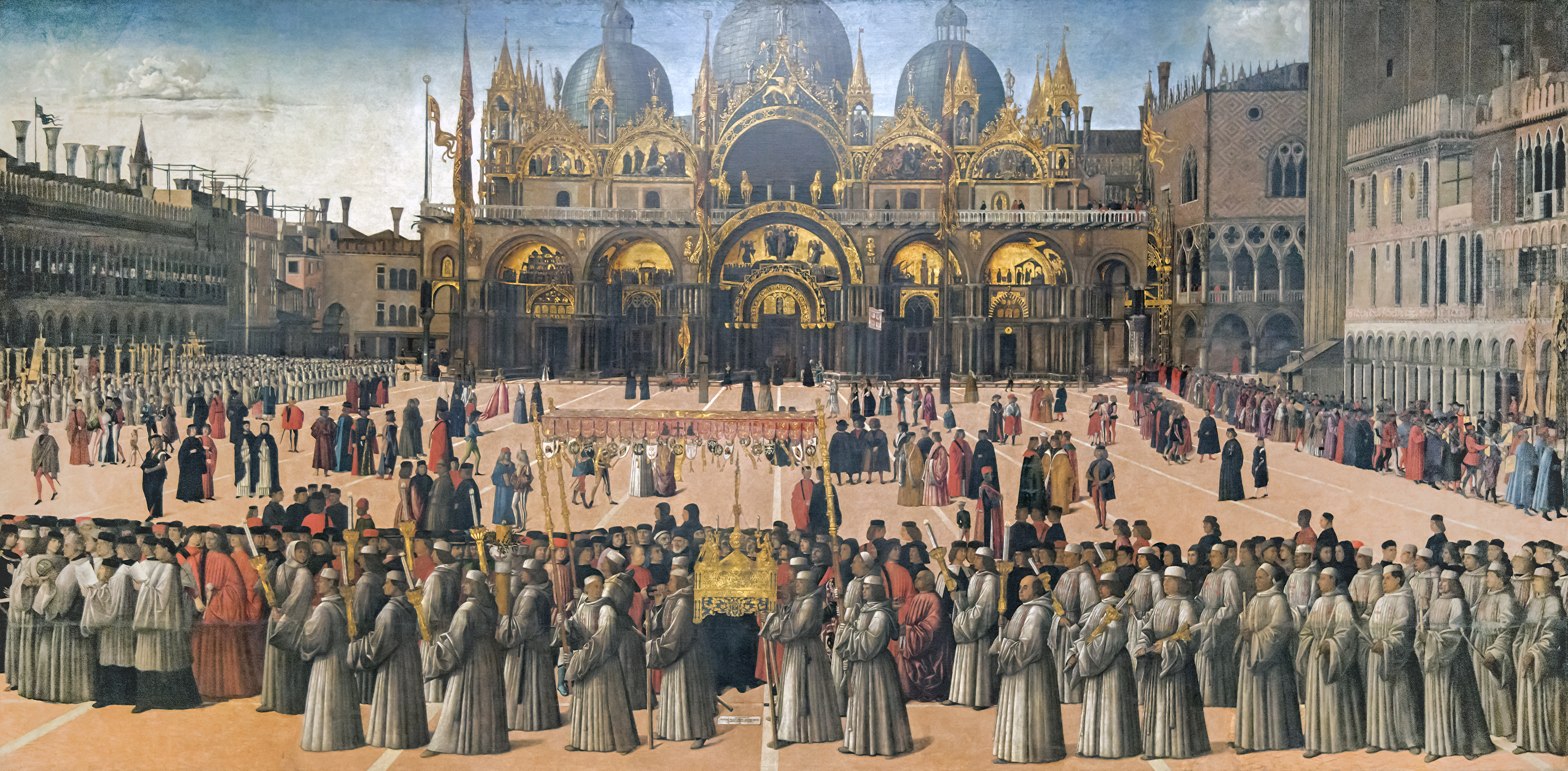
- Artist: Gentile Bellini
- Year: c. 1496
- Medium: Tempera on canvas
- Dimensions: 347 cm × 770 cm (137 in × 300 in)
- Location: Gallerie dell'Accademia; Venice

The Procession in St. Mark's Square (Italian: Processione in piazza San Marco) is a tempera-on-canvas painting by Italian Renaissance artist Gentile Bellini, dating from c. 1496. It is housed in the Gallerie dell'Accademia in Venice.

== History ==
The painting was commissioned for the Grand Hall of the Scuola Grande di San Giovanni Evangelista, the seat of the eponymous brotherhood in Venice. The commission included a total of nine large canvasses, by prominent artists of the time such as Bellini, Perugino, Vittore Carpaccio, Giovanni Mansueti, Lazzaro Bastiani, and Benedetto Rusconi.

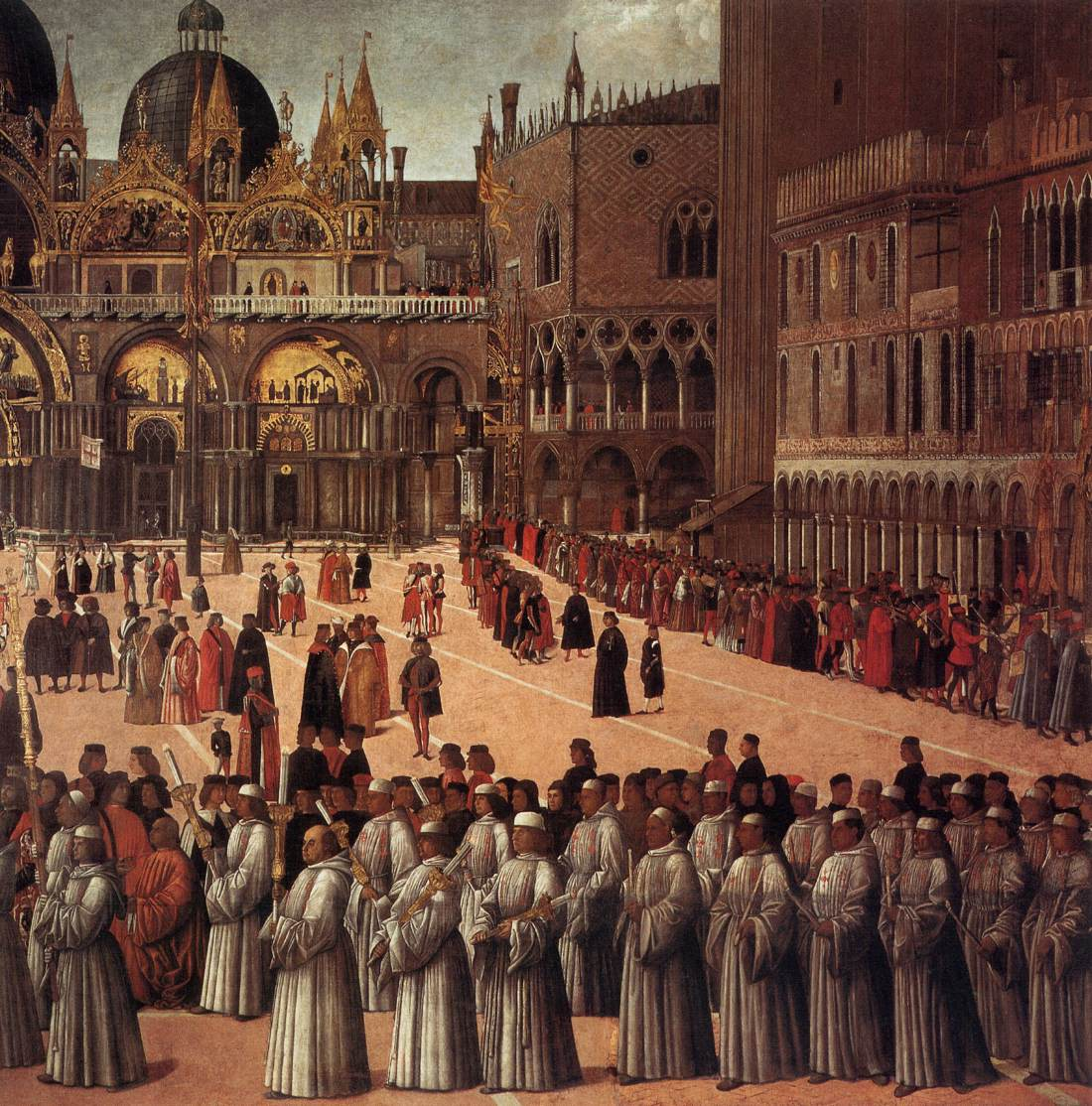
Detail.

The subject of the paintings were to be the miracles of a fragment of the True Cross. The item had been donated to the brotherhood by Philippe de Mézières, chancellor of the Kingdom of Cyprus and Jerusalem in 1369 and soon became the object of veneration in the city.

The canvasses were all executed in 1496–1501.

== Description ==
The canvas shows an event that took place about 50 years earlier, on 25 April 1444: while the members of the Scuola were processing the fragment through the Piazza San Marco (the square of St. Mark's), Jacopo de' Salis, a tradesman from Brescia, knelt before the relic in prayer that his dying son might recover. When he returned home, he discovered that the boy was completely well again.

In the foreground, Gentile has painted the confraternity in its white robes, processing at the head of the parade, the large golden reliquary suspended between them, carried beneath a canopy held by four more Scuola members. Although the subject of the picture is ostensibly the miracle itself, the Brescian merchant is hardly visible in the crowd: he kneels in sumptuous red robes, immediately to the right of the last two canopy-bearers. Rather, the subject of the picture might be more accurately described as the procession, with an especial focus on the space of St. Mark's square and on St Mark's Basilica itself, with its Byzantine domes and glittering mosaics. Regardless of the focus on the foreground of the painting, and unlike many other Venetian linear perspective composition, it lacks a clearly defined focal center. One can notice that Church di San Marco not centered on the composition and this allows the eye of the viewer to venture around the painting to observe the many events going on in the painting.

== See also ==
- Miracle of the True Cross in the Canal of S. Lorenzo
- Miracle of the Relic of the Cross at the Ponte di Rialto
