= Portrait of Catherine Cornaro =

Painting by Gentile Bellini

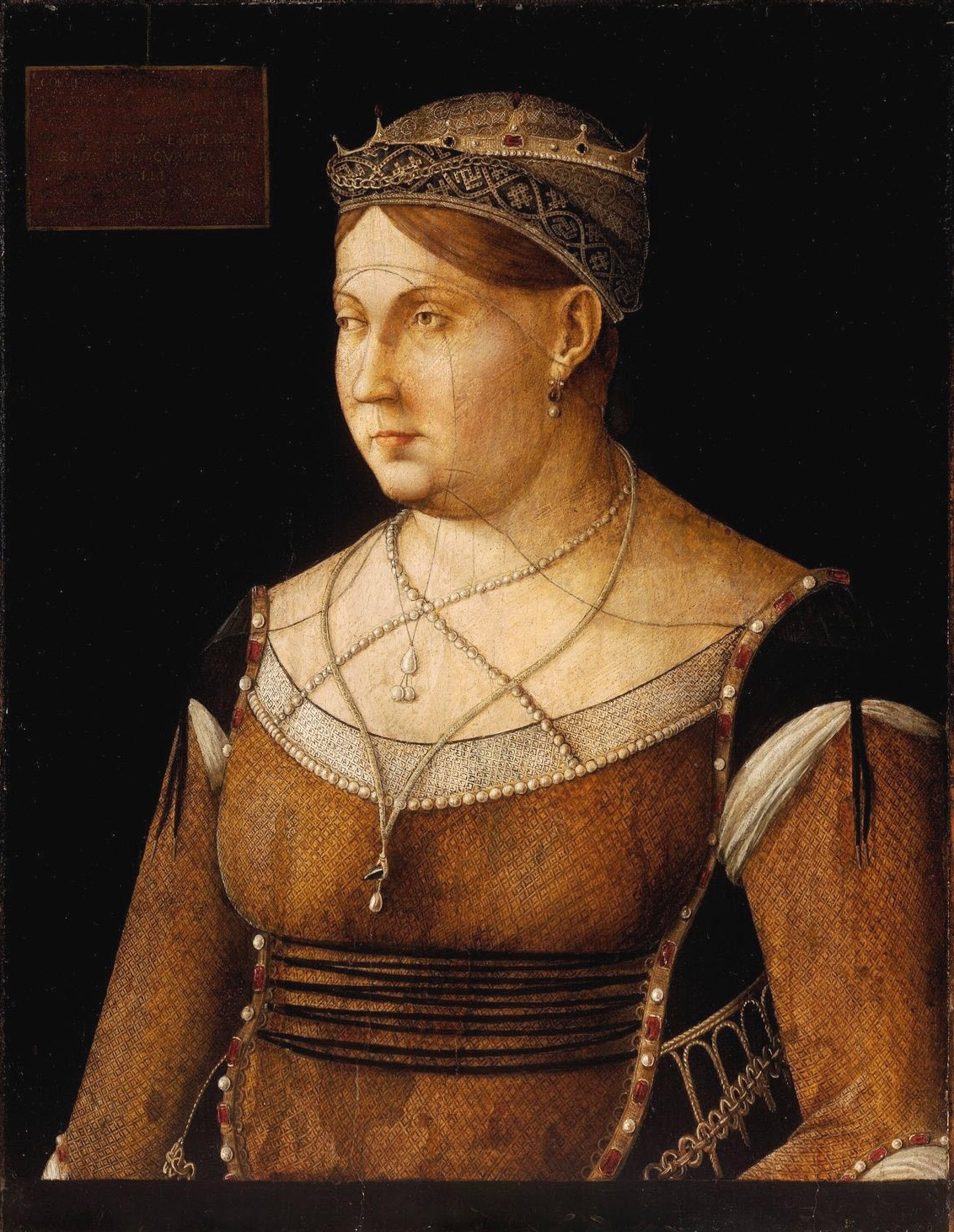
- Artist: Gentile Bellini
- Year: c. 1500
- Medium: Oil on wood
- Dimensions: 63 cm × 49 cm (25 in × 19 in)
- Location: Museum of Fine Arts, Budapest

Portrait of Catherine Cornaro is an oil-on-wood painting by the Italian Renaissance artist Gentile Bellini, created c. 1500. It is held at the Museum of Fine Arts, in Budapest.

== History and description ==
This is one of the few surviving portraits of the Venetian patrician and queen of Cyprus, Catherine Cornaro, wife of King James II. In 1489, Catherine abdicated in favor of the Venetian Republic and lived in seclusion in Asolo, near Venice.

Gentile Bellini created at least two other images of Catherine. The second portrait is held in the Avogadro collection and was Catherine's wedding gift to one of her court ladies. The third known image of Catherine, also by Bellini, is visible in his painting Miracle of the Cross at the Bridge of S. Lorenzo, from 1500, kneeling in the company of her manor house. Her attitude is very similar to that of the painting from the museum in Budapest. Common iconographic elements appear in all the three images.

The Queen is portrayed in the same headdress with a light, transparent veil, behind which viewers can see a tired and mature woman. The outfit of a woman famous both for her intelligence and youth beauty is embroidered with pearls, and around her neck there is a necklace with a pearl pendant. Bellini painted Catherine with objectivity and psychological insight.

The inscription reads, in the upper left corner, in tribute to Bellini: "You see how great I am; but even greater is the hand of Gentile Bellini which portrays me on such a small panel."
