= Portrait of Mehmet II =

Portrait by Gentile Bellini

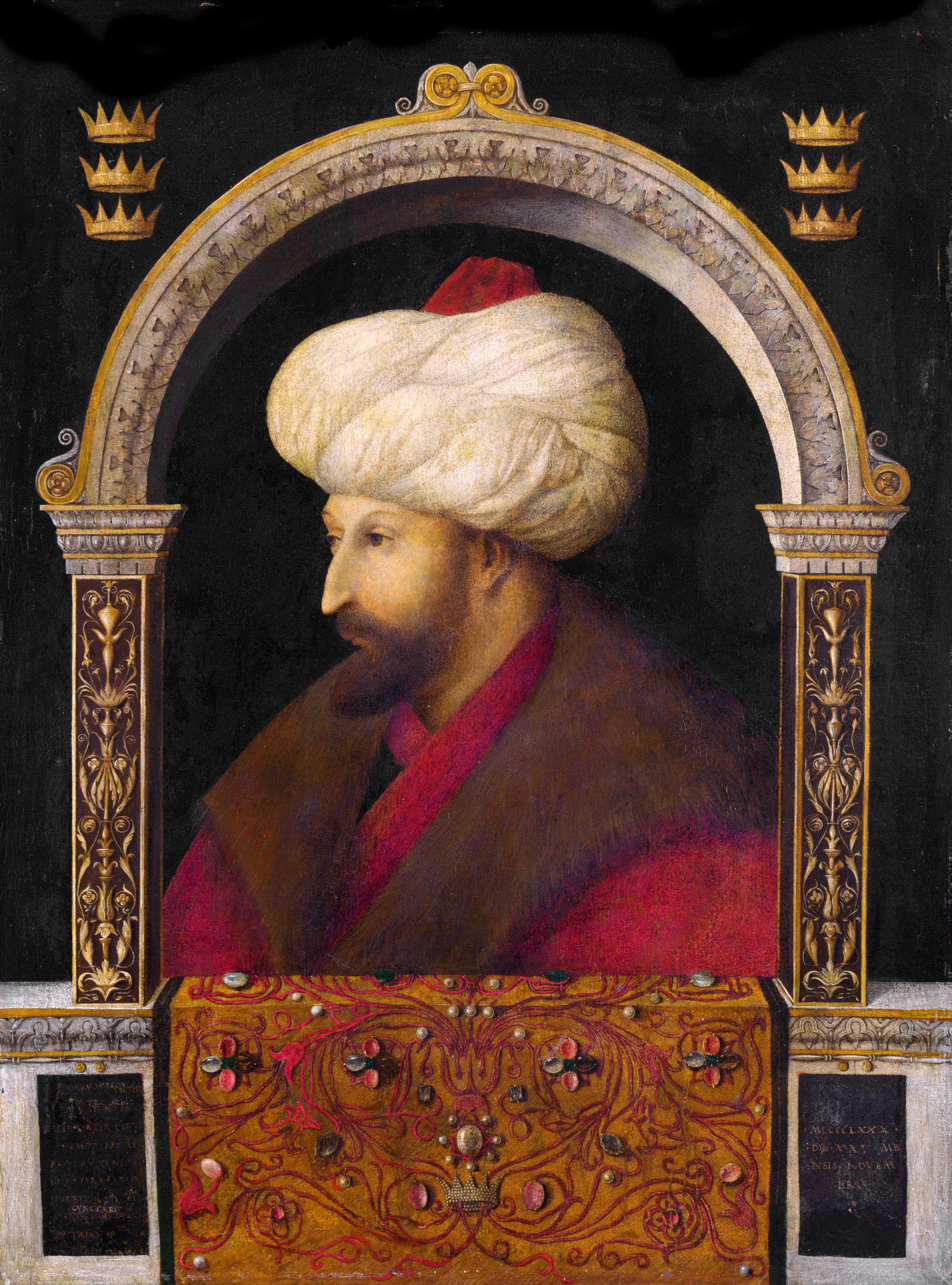
- Artist: Gentile Bellini
- Year: 1480
- Medium: Oil on canvas
- Dimensions: 70 cm × 52 cm (28 in × 20 in)
- Location: National Gallery, London

The Portrait of Mehmet II is a painting by the Venetian artist Gentile Bellini, depicting the Ottoman sultan, Mehmet the Conqueror, now in the Victoria and Albert Museum, London. It was painted in 1480 while Bellini was on a diplomatic mission in Constantinople. This painting records the significant economic and diplomatic ties between Venice and the Ottoman Empire in the 15th century. Before this painting, the Ottomans had recently conquered Constantinople; this put the Venetian Republic in a situation where they had no choice but to accept a peace treaty from Mehmet, the conqueror, in 1479. Venice was actively tied with Constantinople through commercial links because of its proximity to the Mediterranean Sea. The importation of raw silk, cotton, illuminated manuscripts, inlaid metalwork, and spices would have ground to a halt without this peace treaty. After a peace treaty was brokered between the Venetian Republic and the Ottoman Empire, Sultan Mehmet II decided that he would like an Italian painter to be in residence at his court and paint for him; this task was placed upon Gentile Bellini. At the time, Bellini was a painter of doges, primarily in Venice. Thus, Italy's decision to send Bellini to Constantinople to paint a portrait of Mehmet II was a diplomatic gesture aimed at fostering peace and promoting cooperation between the two nations.

In the 19th century, the painting of Sultan Mehmet was in poor condition and had been heavily repainted. There was too much mishandling and over-cleaning, which resulted in many art historians being unable to confirm that the painting was by Bellini's hand. Art historians agree that about 10% of what we see in this painting is done by the Renaissance master Gentile. Regardless, this painting showcases Gentile Bellini's skills, which the Sultan highly regarded. It also cleverly combines European and Islamic culture, reinforcing the Sultan's desire for a Venetian painter in his court. Bellini's portrait left a lasting influence on Ottoman painting; several paintings, one of which was attributed to Shiblizade Ahmed, exist that derive their compositions from Bellini's.

== Description ==
Anonymous Venetian (associated with Gentile Bellini) Portrait of Mehmet II
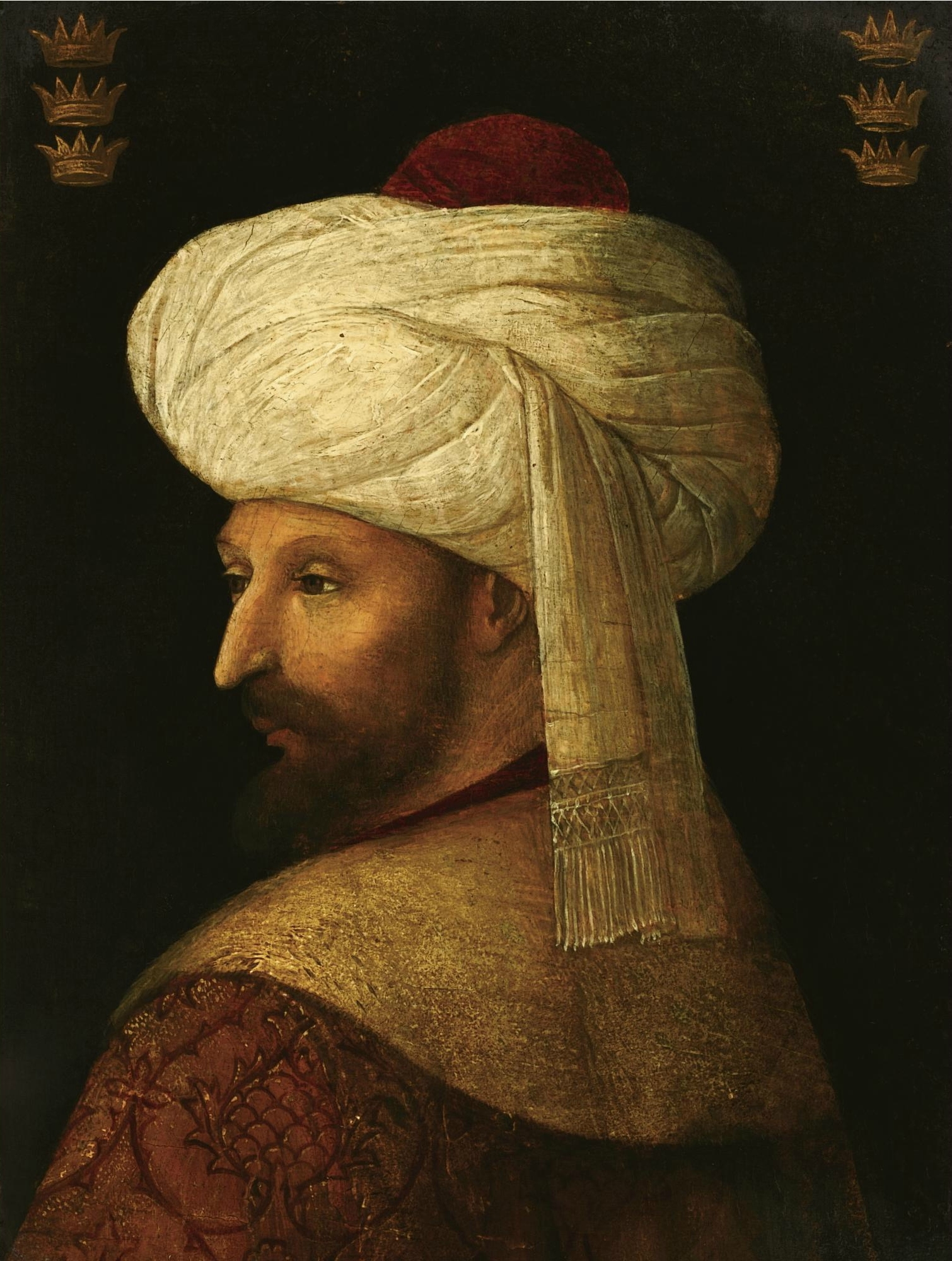
- Artist: Unknown
- Year: 1510

Mehmet is depicted wearing his red caftan layered on top with a lavish fur veil in addition to his headdress, which consists of a wrapped turban over a red taj, indicating his rank and religious identity. A piece of Ottoman embroidery hangs down the front of the frame, encrusted with jewels. This painting by Bellini is significant as it marks a shift from fantasy to naturalism in Western depictions of the Turks. Venetian travellers who returned from the East were inspired to create factual images of the Muslim world, leading to more authentic portrayals. The painting of the Sultan shows a blend of European and Islamic cultures. Probably in the nineteenth century, the portrait was heavily repainted. The Sultan is depicted by Bellini under an arch and in near profile, both symbols of power in the West since the Roman Empire. However, Mehmet is also portrayed in the attire of Islamic power. He wears a deep red caftan, a luxurious brown fur mantle, and a wrapped turban over a red taj, a headdress that signifies his rank and identity as a Muslim. The Sultan commissioned this portrait to be highly accurate, which can be seen in the precision of his arched brow and aquiline nose. Art historians believe that because Mehmed requested an Italian artist at the time, he wanted a very naturalistic likeness to be painted of him and wanted to be viewed as an Italian ruler in a stylized natural portrait. The details in the picture were used to determine the date of the painting. For instance, the Sultan's drawn face and sunken neck suggest that the portrait was painted in 1480, the year before the Sultan's illness. During his stay in Constantinople, Bellini developed an appreciation for Ottoman and Islamic art, reflected in both the Portrait of Mehmet II and his later works. Mehmet was interested in Italian art, specifically portraiture. He owned many objects made by Italian artists and architects, and he wanted an accurate portrayal of himself in his portrait. For this reason, he asked for a Venetian painter who could create a painting that was true to reality. The rounding, voluminous forms of Mehmet's garb and turban greatly contrasted with his hooked nose and pointed chin, which has sharp, thin, and angular features. Bellini used classical conventions in Italy at the time to portray Mehmed as being distanced from the viewer. Surrounding the portrait is a painted frame consisting of an arch reminiscent of classicizing portals from Venice in that period, as well as the parapet draped with a cloth.[6] The lower left of the painting has the inscription "Victor Orbis" or "Conqueror of the World." Another partial inscription about Bellini's artistry remains in the painting: "... the true skill of Gentile Bellini, nature's golden soldier, recalls the sultan's [appearance], [and] represents all things in their particularities… [Bellini] made this same image on the 15th day of the month of November 1480." This inscription is in such bad shape that it is hard for art historians to confidently translate most of it. Looking closely at the painting, some apparent inconsistencies or misconnections can be seen. The arch and overall painting outside the figure are polished, well-painted, yet incredibly flimsy-looking. It frames Mehmet ideally at the top, but then his body is hidden by the sides. Mehmet looks blurred in comparison to the architecture surrounding him. It is almost as if the background, middle ground, and foreground of this painting have been combined.

== History ==
=== Mehmet II ===
Mehmet II was a highly respected and distinguished individual recognized by many titles, including "The Man Who Connected The World." In 1453, the Ottoman Sultan Mehmet II led the conquest of Constantinople, the capital of the Byzantine Empire, a momentous event that left a lasting impact on early modern Europe. This historic occasion not only transformed the social and political dynamics of the region but also positioned the Ottomans favorably in terms of future economic and military prospects. Mehmed II, the Ottoman Sultan, recognized that his vision of attaining worldwide dominance could not be achieved solely through military conquests. He, therefore, sought to promote his authority through the arts. Mehmed II believed art could be a powerful tool to reflect his prestige and authority, both within and outside his empire. As such, he invested heavily in the arts, commissioning renowned artists to create works that would glorify his reign and serve as a lasting testament to his legacy. By doing so, Mehmed II aimed to establish his reign as a cultural and intellectual center, cementing his world leader position. Mehmed II was impressed by the Renaissance fashion of contemporary rulers, who used medals and portraits to establish their public image, much like Italian princes did. As a result, he decided to follow this trend and commissioned a portrait and medals for himself.

=== Diplomatic Relations Between Venice and the Ottoman Empire ===
In 1453, Sultan Mehmet II's conquest of Constantinople marked a significant moment in European history, with substantial implications for surrounding countries and nations with diplomatic ties to Constantinople. Among these were the Italian states, which had a trade relationship with Constantinople. After the Ottoman Empire's rise, the Italian states were compelled to cultivate cordial relations with the new power to maintain their economic interests. Venice was also a crucial trading hub and sought to remain central to the Mediterranean's commercial activities. However, this rivalry led to costly wars between Venice and the Ottoman Empire. Eventually, Venice adopted a policy of maintaining good relations with the Ottoman Empire, realizing the mutual benefits of doing so.

=== Bellini's stay in the Ottoman Empire ===
Medal of Mehmet II (Reverse Side)
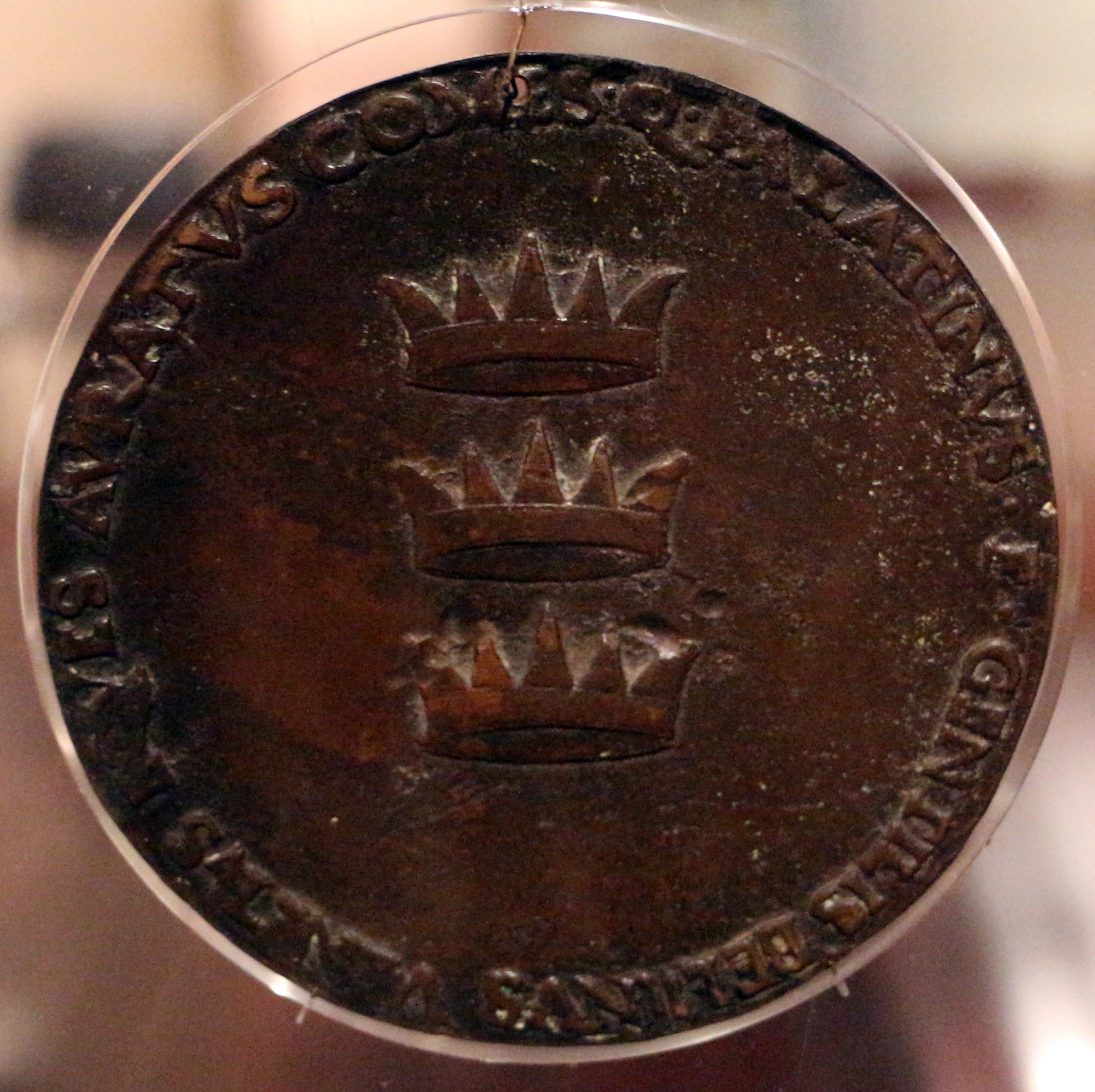
- Artist: Gentile Bellini
- Year: 1480

On January 25, 1479, seven months after the end of the war between the Ottoman Empire and Venice, Sultan Mehmed took the opportunity to begin a diplomatic relationship with Venice. The mission was to request a talented Venetian painter to be at Mehmed's disposal, which resulted in Gentile Bellini's loan. Bellini's position in the eyes of the Sultan was embellished by a published account by Jacopo Filippo Foresti da Bergamo in 1490, conceivably in partnership with Bellini himself. It stated: "His talent one day reached the ears of Mehmed, Prince of the Turks, who burning with desire of seeing him, wrote humbly to the Venetian Senate with a request that it should as a great favor send [Gentile] to him in Constantinople as a gift when he arrived ... so that his entire art might be tested even further. [Mehmed] required that he be rendered in his form. And when the emperor beheld the image so similar to himself, he admired the man's powers and said that he surpassed all other painters who existed." There is no evidence Bellini was ever requested by name, contrary to Foresti's claim, which Vasari himself subsequently took up in the same manner. It was recorded that Mehmed asked for a "good painter" who was good at portraiture. Even though the painting by Bellini of Mehmet II is the only authenticated work from his stay in Constantinople, other works attributed to Bellini related to his stay in Constantinople. There's a double portrait of a young man with Mehmet, now privately owned in Switzerland. This painting had an ancient label attached to it, which identified Bellini as the painter and the subjects as Mehmet II and his son Jem, the younger brother of the predecessor to the throne, Beyazit. There are also sketches of a young woman and a janissary in the British Museum.

=== Provenance ===
Turkish Janissary
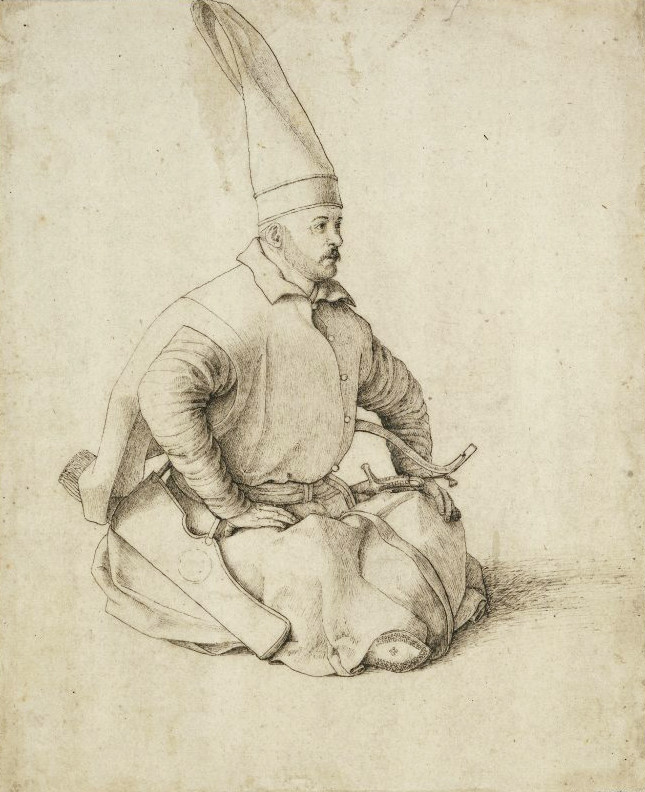
- Artist: Gentile Bellini
- Year: 1479–1481

The painting is inscribed in the bottom corner, "November 15, 1480." Six months after this painting was made, Mehmet II died from health complications stemming from gout and edema of the legs. Art historians believed Mehmet's successor, Bayezid II, sold many of his father's portraits after his death. Bayezid disapproved of his father's commissioned paintings. Still, he also sold the paintings to help finance a large mosque complex established ca. 1500. Historians believe the painting could have been bought by Venetian merchants in the Levant in the early 16th century and brought to Venice, where another painting of Mehmet by an unknown artist would have been made using the painting by Gentile as a type of prototype. Bellini's portrait of the Sultan was observed using X-ray imagery while at its current National Gallery in London residence. The X-ray revealed that no trace of the Sultan's face remains in the painting, while the rest of the details, such as the turban, textiles, arch, and crowns, are still visible. The best explanation for the deliberate localized damage to Mehmet's face is an iconoclastic. This was not uncommon in the Ottoman Empire; to make an offending image inanimate, they would destroy the face. Later examples are in the manuscript of Semailname of 1579, which shows the repainting of sultans' faces that were destroyed at some point.

== Interpretation and symbolic meaning ==
Portrait of Sultan Mehmed II with a young dignitary
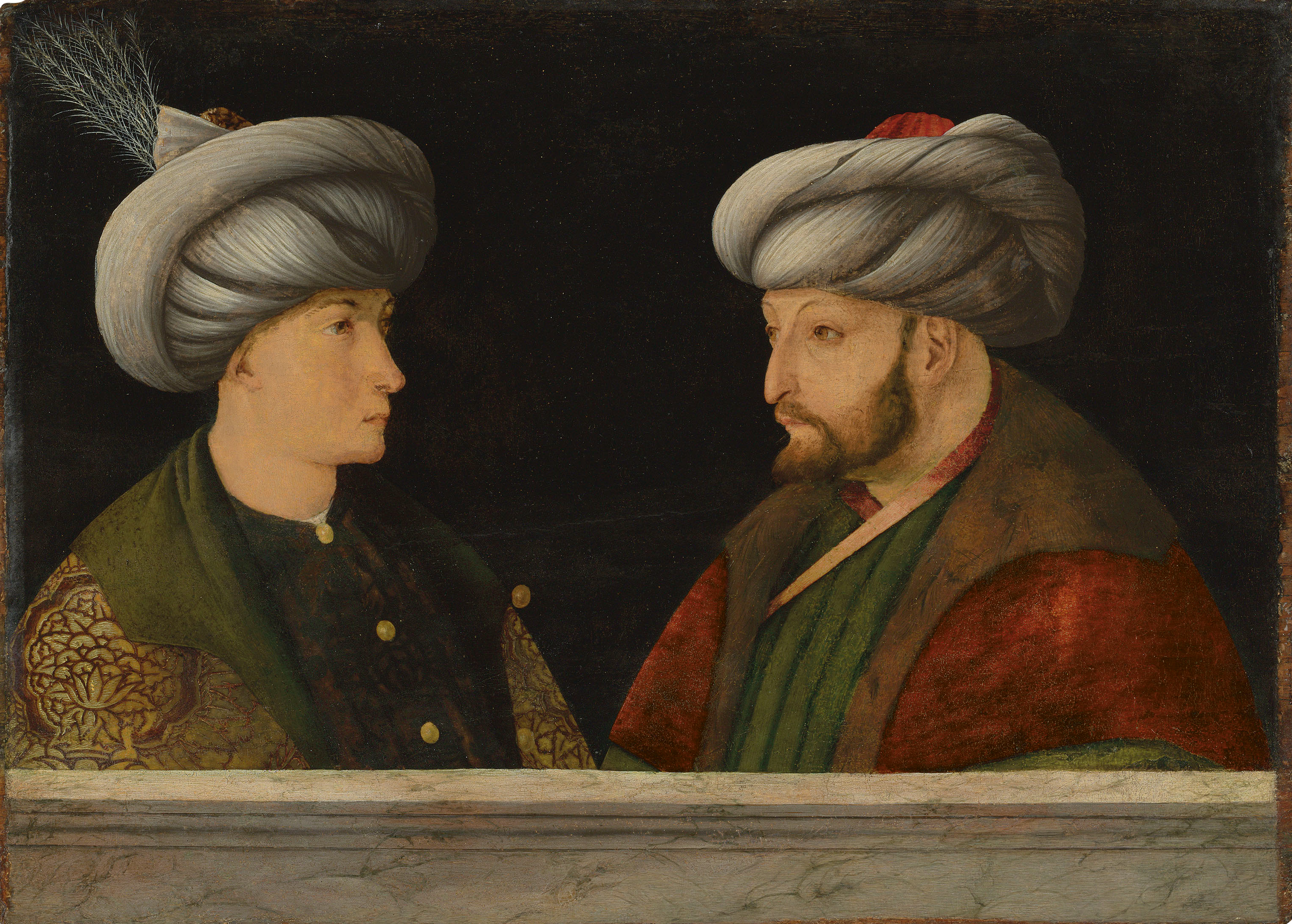
- Artist: Workshop of Gentile Bellini
- Year: 1479

Mehmet II had many nicknames, including "The Man Who Connected The World". He had an honorable reputation. For "a Turk" to ask a Western painter to paint a portrait of him is unusual, considering the perceptions of Turks in the West. Bellini's portrait can be interpreted as a tool that helped the West transition from stereotypical Islamic perceptions to more authentic perceptions. The portrait is unlike any other painting in terms of what it represents. Bellini didn't draw a portrait of Mehmet II because he wanted to depict what a sultan looks like in his painting. He drew the portrait because Mehmet II asked and paid him to do it. At the time in Venice, Bellini was a painter who painted portraits of Doges, so Italy sent him to Constantinople to paint a portrait of Mehmet II, which can be interpreted as a diplomatic gift that signifies peace and cooperation. Mehmet's reason for asking for a Venetian painter stemmed from his interest in Italian art. He owned many objects made for him by Italian artists and architects but was specifically interested in the art of portraiture. Mehmet cared greatly about paintings that were accurate to reality, and he wanted them for his portrait. Rumour has it that Mehmed II once examined a painting by Gentile Bellini depicting the beheading of Saint John the Baptist and doubted the artist’s ability to portray the scene realistically. To test Bellini’s skill, the Sultan allegedly ordered the decapitation of an enslaved person in front of him and pointed out the anatomical errors in the painted neck. However, this story is almost certainly a myth. It first appears in the writings of Carlo Ridolfi, produced nearly two centuries after Bellini’s visit to the Ottoman court. Ridolfi drew on classical precedents—particularly Seneca’s account of the Greek painter Parrhasius, where artistic imitation is presented as the ultimate goal—and his narrative was also shaped by enduring European fears of the Ottomans, often portrayed as cruel barbarians. The three crowns shown on the backside of Bellini's medal representing the sultan are a heraldic device repeated on both sides of his painting of the Sultan. The three crowns would have been easily referenced by Europeans familiar with the Swedish royal coat of arms or as a reference to the three realms (Papal triregnum). However, in the context of images of Mehmet, the three crowns probably reference Magna Graecia (Southern Italy), Trebizond, and Asia. Looking closely at Bellini's painting, the forward-most portion of the painting features an obscure seventh crown embroidered in the draped fabric. In the past, the seven crowns were suggested to define Mehmed's position in the Ottoman dynasty. Another portrait of Mehmed, probably made in Venice around c.1510, seems to show that the seven crowns were not significant, at least not in the way past historians thought they could have been. This painting, done about 31 years later, omits the seventh crown, meaning it may not have been as integral to Mehmet's identity as previously thought.

== In other media ==
In Marcel Proust's novel Remembrance of Things Past, Bloch's appearance as a boy is likened to M. Swann's portrait of Mehmet II.

In Guy Gavriel Kay’s novel Children of Earth and Sky, set in a fictionalized version of medieval Europe (with a “quarter turn to the fantastic”) the character Gurcu the Destroyer is at least partially based on Mehmet II, and a main plot point involves the artist Pero Villani painting his portrait “in the western style.”

== Bibliography ==
- Rodini, Elizabeth. 2020. Gentile Bellini's Portrait of Sultan Mehmed II: Lives and Afterlives of an Iconic Image. London: I. B. Tauris & Company
- Carboni, Stefano. 2007. Venice and the Islamic World: 828–1797. New York: Metropolitan Museum of Art.
- Campbell, Caroline, and Alan Chong. 2005. Bellini and the East. London: National Gallery Co.
- Harper, James G. 2011. The Turk and Islam in the Western Eye, 1450–1750: Visual imagery before Orientalism. Farnham: Ashgate.
- Karpeles, Eric. 2017. Paintings in Proust, A Visual Companion to In Search of Lost Time.
