= Portrait of the Doge Giovanni Mocenigo =

Painting by Gentile Bellini

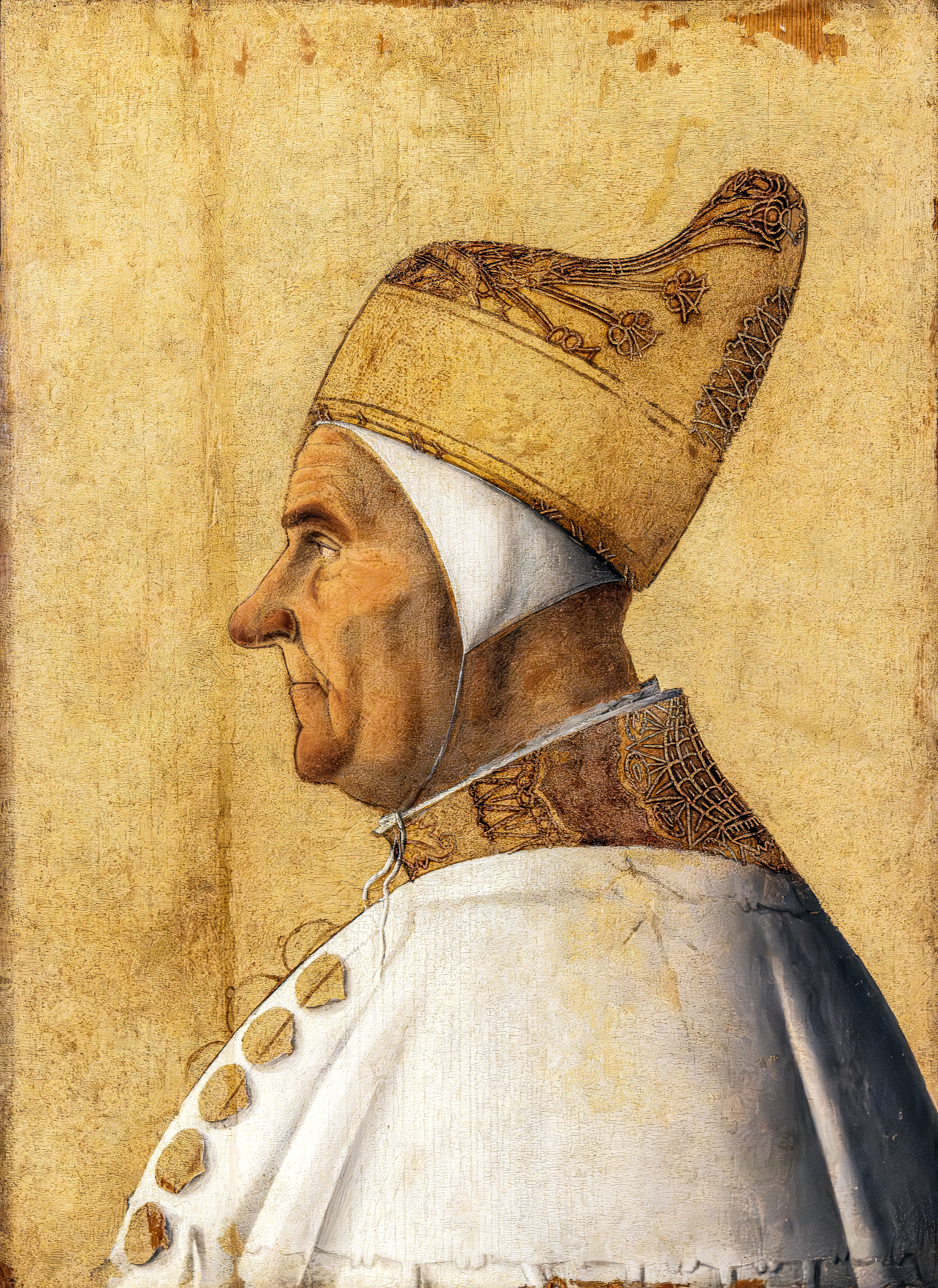
- Artist: Gentile Bellini
- Year: c. 1478–1485
- Medium: Tempera on wood
- Dimensions: 62 cm × 45.5 cm (24 in × 17.9 in)
- Location: Museo Correr, Venice

The Portrait of the Doge Giovanni Mocenigo is a tempera-on-wood painting attributed to Italian artist Gentile Bellini, datable between 1478 and 1485. It is held at the Museo Correr, in Venice.

== Description and analysis ==
The portrait depicts the doge Giovanni Mocenigo, wearing the official clothes of his office: the doge's Corno ducale and the gold cloth embroidered in relief. The doge is represented in profile and stands out against a gold background, which has a strong symbolic value that underlines the customs and iconographic tangencies between Venice and the Byzantine artistic world of Constantinople. The portrait, which still appears linked to more "traditional" models of representation, seems distant from the solutions adopted by Gentile's brother and fellow painter, Giovanni Bellini for the famous Portrait of Doge Leonardo Loredan, stands out for his great quality and realism. The portrait appears to have been made directly "from life", and depicts Giovanni Mocenigo as a private man, while also celebrating his public role as the doge of Venice.

== Provenance ==
Little is known about the origin of the work. It was most likely painted during the years when Giovanni Mocenigo was doge (1478–1485). The painting arrived to the public collections of the city of Venice in 1830, with the legate Correr. The exact circumstances of when or where Teodoro Correr bought the painting are not known.
