= Saint Mark Preaching in Alexandria =

Painting by Giovanni Bellini and Gentile Bellini

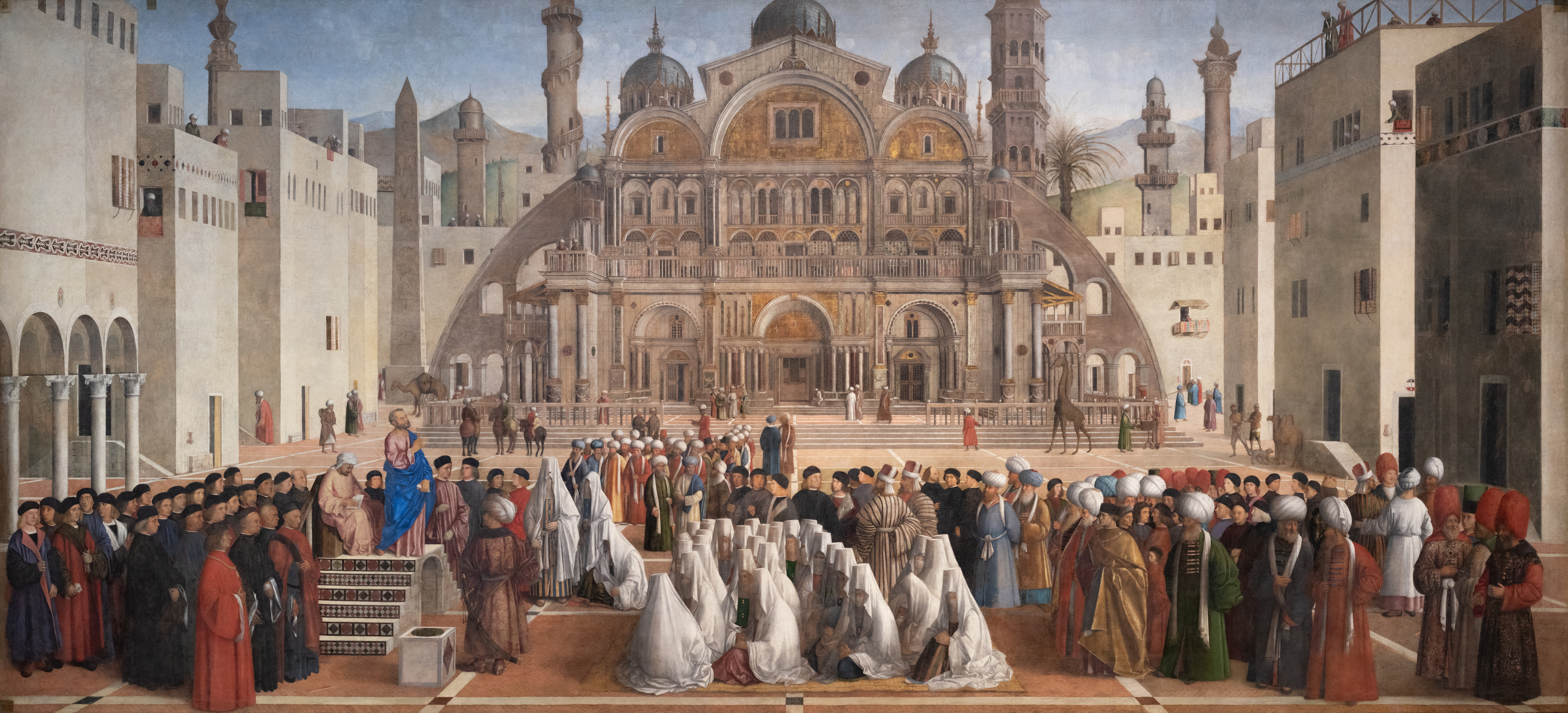
- Artist: Gentile Bellini and Giovanni Bellini
- Year: 1504–1507
- Medium: Oil on canvas
- Dimensions: 3.47 m × 7.70 m (137 in × 303 in)
- Location: Pinacoteca di Brera; Milan

Saint Mark Preaching in Alexandria is an oil painting by the Italian Renaissance artists Gentile and Giovanni Bellini, dated to 1504–1507 and held in the Pinacoteca di Brera, in Milan.

== History ==
The work is a huge canvas (telero) destined for the Scuola Grande di San Marco in Venice. It is 26 m^{2} in surface, and has rich narrative and iconographic features. The cycle of paintings with stories of the life of Saint Mark was completed around 60 years later by Giorgione and Tintoretto, and is today housed in the Pinacoteca di Brera and the Accademia in Venice.

The canvas was started by Gentile in July 1504, but after his death in February 1507, when it was "largely completed", it passed to his brother Giovanni, as indicated in Gentile's will. Giovanni completed it, making some modifications. The invitation to complete it was probably from his brother just before he died, to which Giovanni probably responded negatively, This explains its insertion in the will of the clause that consigned a precious collection of drawing to Giovanni should he complete the painting. The commission was confirmed as being passed to Giovanni by the Scuola on 7 March 1507.

The scene is rich with exotic elements adapted from real-life that Gentile had the opportunity to study during his trip to Constantinople in 1479–1480. Decorative elements of Mamluk architecture, rather than Ottoman, suggest that the artist may also have reached Jerusalem. This painting combines two distinct moments in time, one ancient and one contemporary to Bellini's life, as well as three different places, Alexandria, Venice, and a mountainous landscape in the background. The arrangement of the huge "historia", imagined as an arranged portrayal on a wide stage shut on three sides by huge architectural dividers, was plainly Gentile. The style of the design proposed to the painter during his excursion in the East (where the Republic had sent him in 1479 in the entourage of a discretionary mission) is quite similar to Mameluke models, which prompted the hypothesis that Gentile may have continued from Constantinople to Jerusalem on a journey, and from that point have recorded new building thoughts that were not quite the same as Ottoman styles, the last being more natural to Venetians.

It is not clear which parts were done by which brother: Vasari only mentioned Gentile in the 1550 version of the Vite, and omitting them in the 1568 edition. Modern criticism considers Gentile to have executed the background, except for the modified parts, and possibly the characters on the right-hand side. Giovanni is assigned with some certainty the portraits on the left, and some of the central group.

The painting of Saint Mark Preaching in Alexandria was commissioned by the Scuola Grande di San Marco (the Great Confraternity of Saint Mark) in Venice for their gathering house in the Campo San Giovanni e Polo, perhaps the biggest important square in Venice. The Scuola Grande di San Marco was reconstructed after a massive fire took a hit on the old structure on 31 March 1485 toward the end of the fifteenth century. The room that contained the most prestigious paintings and focus was the meeting space where it demonstrated their patron saint's narrating life. The Scuola Grande di San Marco looked to the most valuable painter Gentile Bellini to create this painting.

The canvas was reduced at an unknown time, a strip along the top being cut away, where the buildings finished. The work arrived in the Brera in 1809, following the Napoleonic invasion.

== Description ==
The large-scale oil painting depicts a massive stage in the center of the main city and the pavement appears to be created of large square red brick stones. Behind the stage are three tall blue domed temples along with minaret-like towers and big square light colored houses, along the side as well. The side buildings are decorated with light colored red facade and rooftop porches on top. In front of the stage, there are about a hundred contrastingly dressed individuals who have assembled on this square. The men are shown wearing caftans, frocks, cloaks, turbans, and immense hats, while the women are dressed in white from head to ankle-length veils. The attribution of the different pieces of the work to every artisan is as yet a matter of discussion among researchers; in any case, the most generally held view allots Gentile the meaning of the primary lines of the scene, where components of Venetian engineering are superimposed on structures of unmistakably Mediterranean and Oriental inference.

The background of the painting is overpowered by the assortment and distinction of various building structures and models that are reflected by the painted cityscape. In one manner or the other, the various buildings all appear to insinuate a wide range of Eastern Mediterranean architectural types. To indicate just a portion of the implications: The gigantic structure in the focal point of the square, for instance, looks to some extent like Eastern holy places. With its structure of round curves, its marble-shaded façade adornments, and glossy vault covers, it reviews a portion of the primary qualities of early Byzantine holy places. The most generally held view allots Gentile the meaning of the primary lines of the scene, where components of Venetian engineering are superimposed on structures of unmistakably Mediterranean and Oriental inference.

== Subject ==
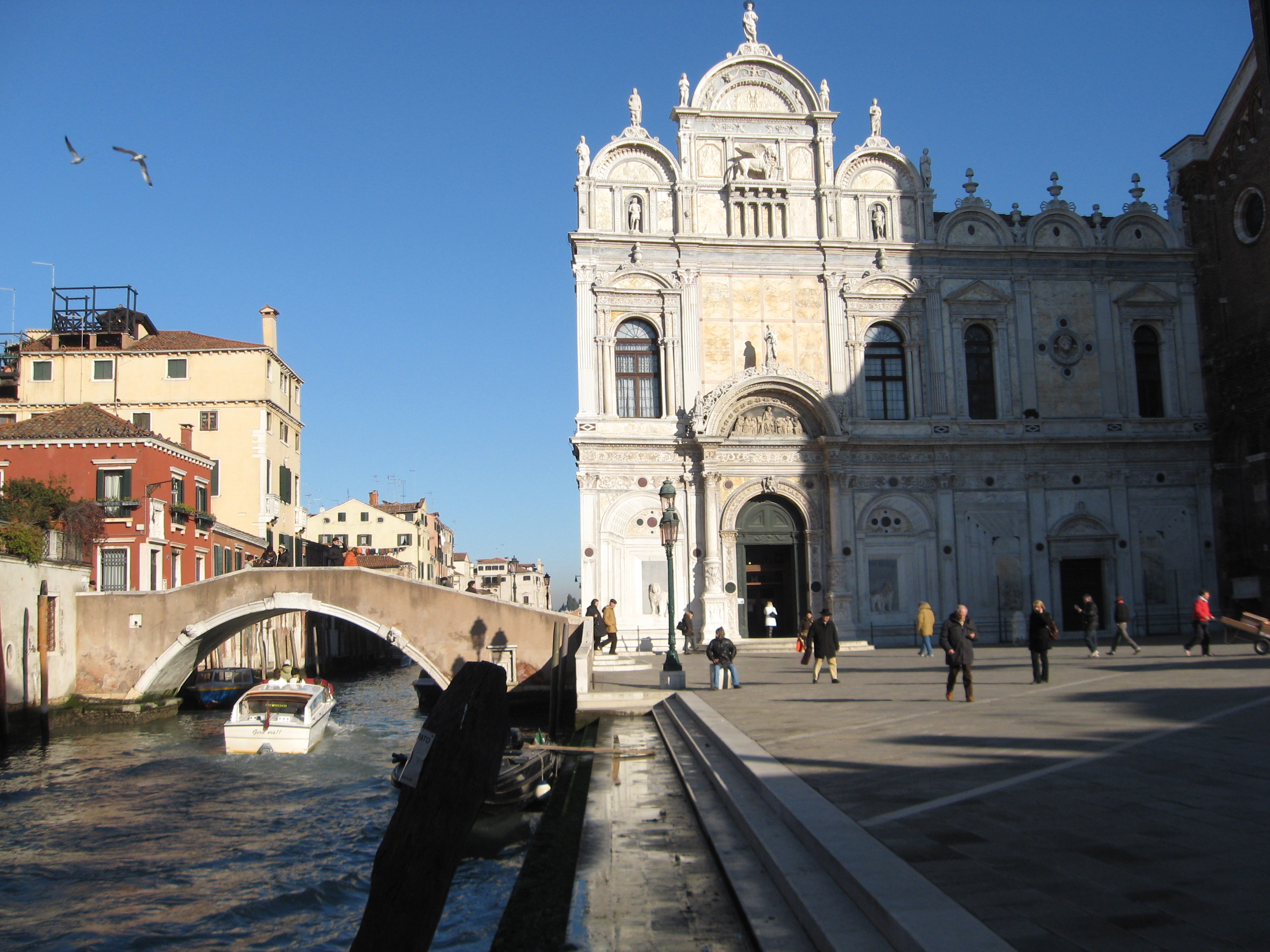
Scuola Grande di San Marco, Venice

This painting depicts Saint Mark, who lived in Alexandria in the first century. In the painting, he is preaching to the locals and some Venetian guests, including peers of the artist and Gentile himself. The structure behind resembles San Marco in Venice, but with the lack of its decoration and sculptural figures. Saint Mark Preaching in Alexandria presents two particular moments in history and three spots—Alexandria, Venice, and the mountains. Since many Venetians would not have understood what Alexandria looked like, everybody would have perceived it as San Marco. The hieroglyph on the obelisk directly above Mark symbolizes that the ancient Egyptians foresaw Christianity. By including contemporary Venetians and Mamluk Egyptians, Gentile is actually making a reference to the present and expressing a hope of reconverting these Muslims to Christianity. Saint Mark Preaching in Alexandria makes known the expectation of reconverting Alexandria, with Saint Mark as an exemplar. Gentile Bellini presented the canvas as a substitute history in which Venetians and Muslims intermix in a location which is neither Venice nor Alexandria and is instead a fanciful city combining highlights of the two locations.

== Attribution ==
=== Gentile Bellini ===
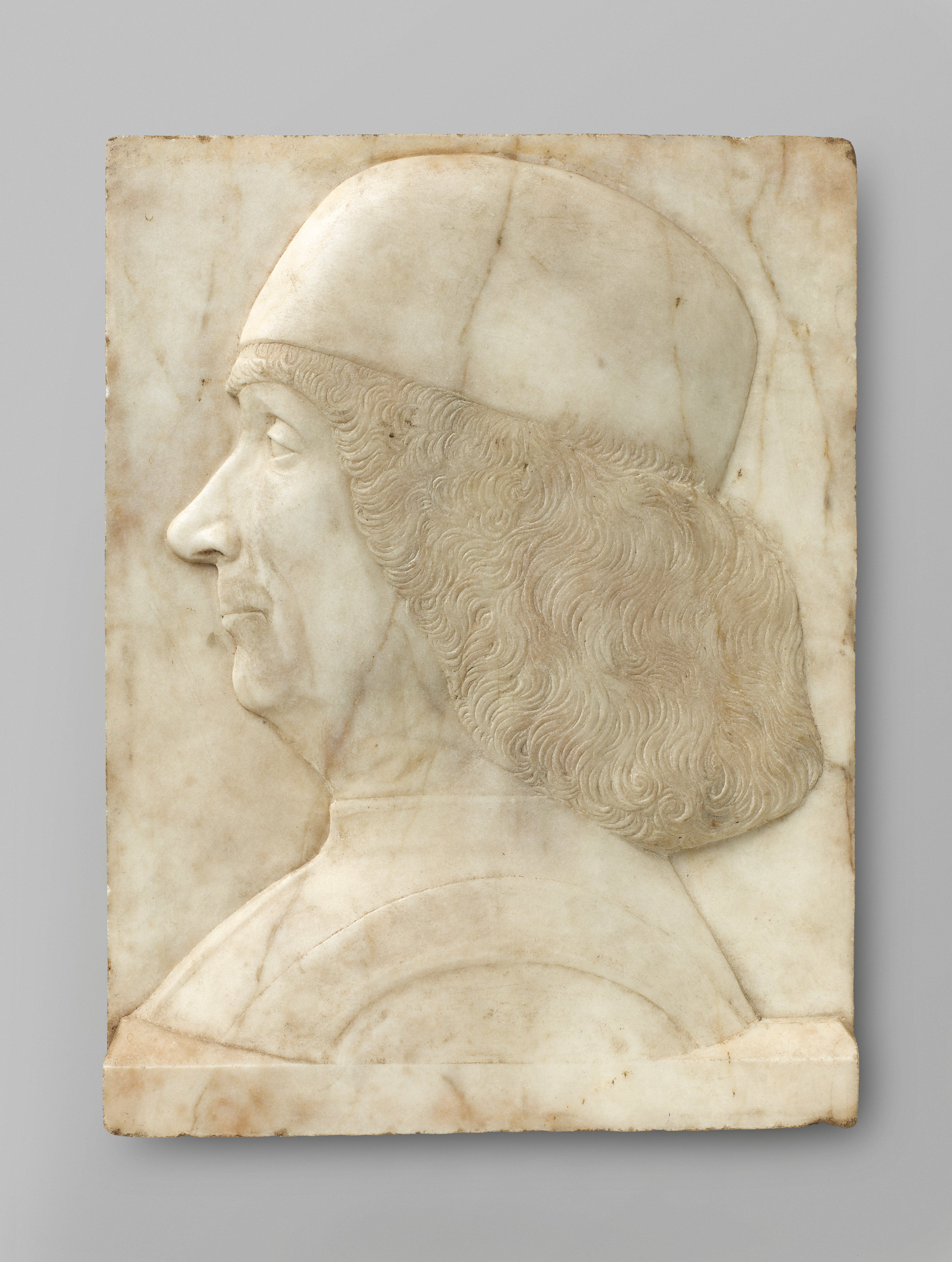
Gentile Bellini (1429–1507)

Gentile Bellini (1429–1507) was born in Venice and was very well known during his time; he was the son of a wealthy artist, Jacobo Bellini, and the older brother of Giovanni Bellini. Gentile was an equipped and fastidious painter and ran the Bellini family workshop, yet he was eclipsed by his more skilled and imaginative sibling Giovanni. He was a Venetian painter particularly known for representations and compositions of the public buildings. Gentile was one of the first to begin the use of oil painting and of the canvas. Venetian painters in the fifteenth-century incorporated stories in their paintings. This style was portrayed with attention on all details of the picture. The main subject of the painting was regularly out of sight, aside, or in any case marginally darkened.

=== Giovanni Bellini ===
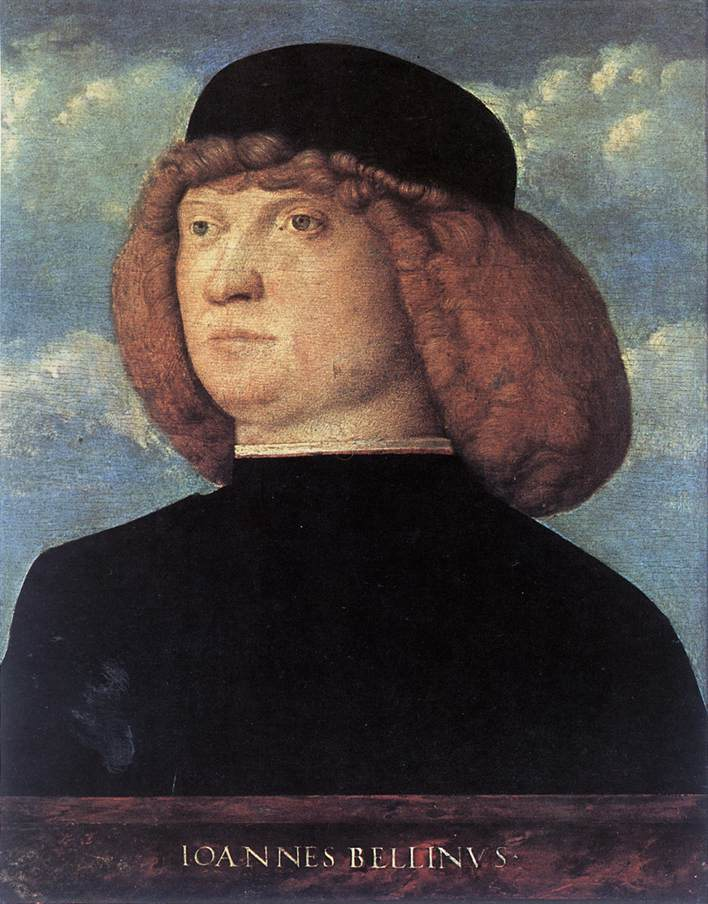
Giovanni Bellini (1431/36–1516)

Giovanni Bellini (1431/36–1516) was born in Venice and was born into an important art family. As he worked in his father's workshop, he demonstrated potential by concentrating on small and medium-size reverential boards for private proprietorship. Bellini first connected and worked with his brother Gentile up until the point of his death. After 1479, he routinely worked for the doge's royal residence, where he was charged to paint scenes of Venetian history. After his older brother Gentile's demise in 1507, he finished Saint Mark Preaching in Alexandria, which Giovanni had started painting.

== See also ==
- List of works by Giovanni Bellini

== Bibliography ==
- Stefano Zuffi, Grande atlante del Rinascimento, Electa, Milan 2007. ISBN 978-88-370-4898-3
- Various authors, Brera, guida alla pinacoteca, Electa, Milan 2004 ISBN 978-88-370-2835-0
- Mariolina Olivari, Giovanni Bellini, in Various authors, Pittori del Rinascimento, Scala, Florence 2007. ISBN 88-8117-099-X
