= Miracle of the Cross at the Bridge of S. Lorenzo =

Painting by Gentile Bellini

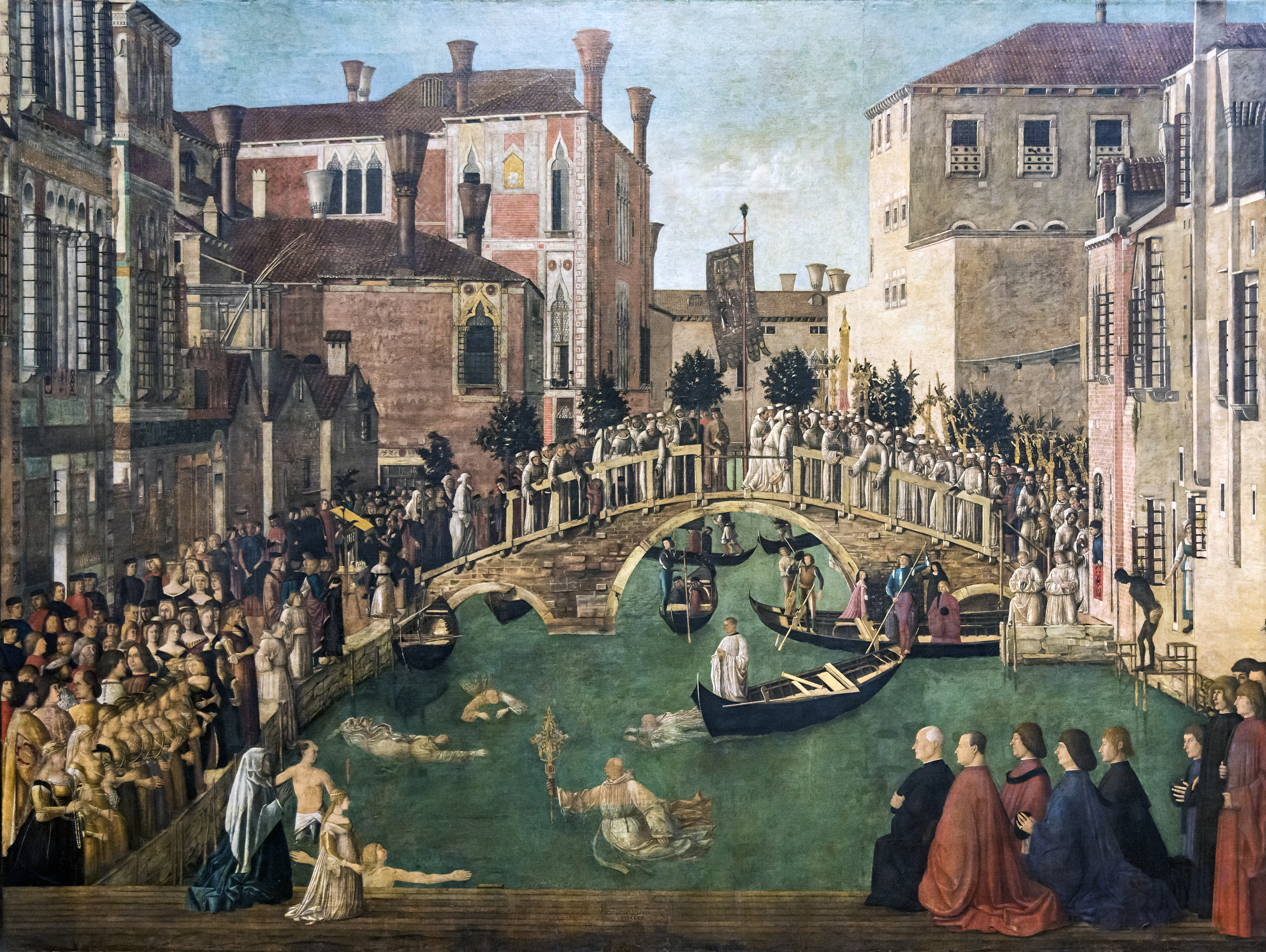
- Artist: Gentile Bellini
- Year: c. 1500
- Medium: Tempera on canvas
- Dimensions: 323 cm × 430 cm (127 in × 170 in)
- Location: Gallerie dell'Accademia; Venice

The Miracle of the Cross at the Bridge of S. Lorenzo (Italian: Miracolo della Croce caduta nel canale di San Lorenzo) is a tempera-on-canvas painting by Italian Renaissance artist Gentile Bellini, dating from c. 1500. It is now housed in the Gallerie dell'Accademia, in Venice.

== History ==
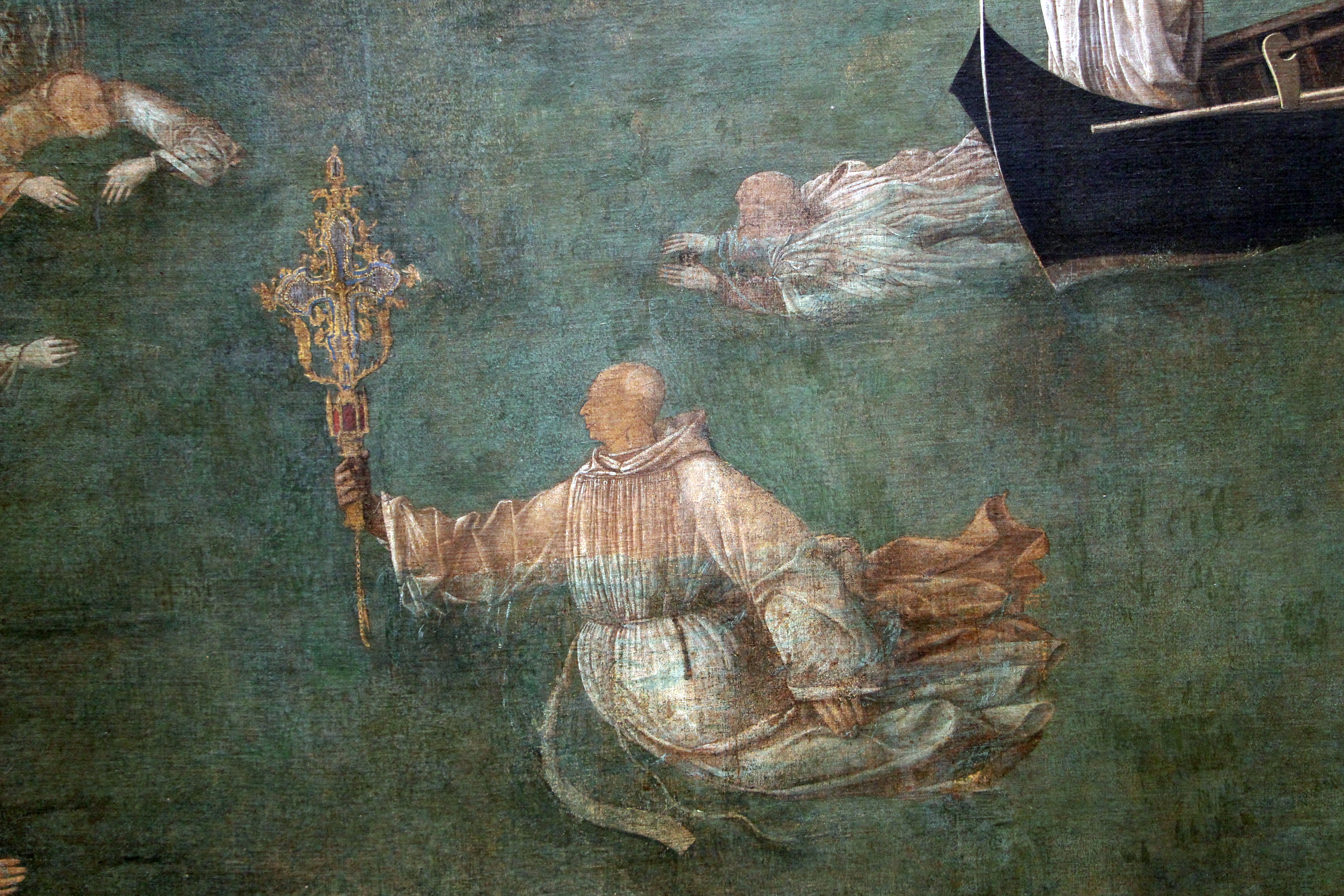
Detail

The painting was commissioned for the Grand Hall of the Scuola Grande di San Giovanni Evangelista, the seat of the eponymous brotherhood in Venice. The commission included a total of nine large canvasses, by prominent artists of the time such as Bellini, Perugino, Vittore Carpaccio, Giovanni Mansueti, Lazzaro Bastiani and Benedetto Rusconi.

The subject of the paintings were to be the miracles of a fragment of the True Cross. The item had been donated to the brotherhood by Philippe de Mézières (or Filippo Maser), chancellor of the Kingdom of Cyprus and Jerusalem in 1369, and soon became the object of veneration in the city.

The canvasses were all executed in 1496–1501. All survive today, aside from that by Perugino, and are now in the Gallerie dell'Accademia.

== Description ==
The work portrays a miracle which took place during one of the yearly processions of the True Cross of the Scuola. The relic fell in the water: it subsequently escaped all the attempts of people to catch it, aside from that of Andrea Vendramin, the Gran Guardiano ("Grand Guardian") of the school.

The painting shows a meticulous depiction of the canale and the bridge near which the reported miracle occurred, and of a number of people who assist to it. The recognizable characters include Caterina Cornaro, queen of Cyprus. Some suppose she is among the kneeling women on the left; however, Catherine Cornaro is the first woman on the left (standing, with a girl to her left). She is praying. The group of gentlemen is perhaps that of Bellini's family, including his self-portrait and that of his brother Giovanni.

At the centre is the Bridge of San Lorenzo ("St. Lawrence Bridge"), full of people who are looking at the event. The fondamente (the roads which flank the Venetian channels) are also crowded, with some people coming on gondolas. Some people have dived and a woman, on the right, is pushing her moorish slave to do the same: however, Andrea Vendramin has already grabbed the relic and is carrying it to the shore.

The buildings are painted with accurate colors, although with no geometrical perspective. Some of them feature the typical inverted cone chimneys of medieval Venice.

== See also ==
- Procession in St. Mark's Square

== Sources ==
- De Vecchi, Pierluigi; Elda Cerchiari (1999). I tempi dell'arte. Milan: Bompiani. ISBN 88-451-7212-0.
