= Gentile Bellini =

Venetian painter

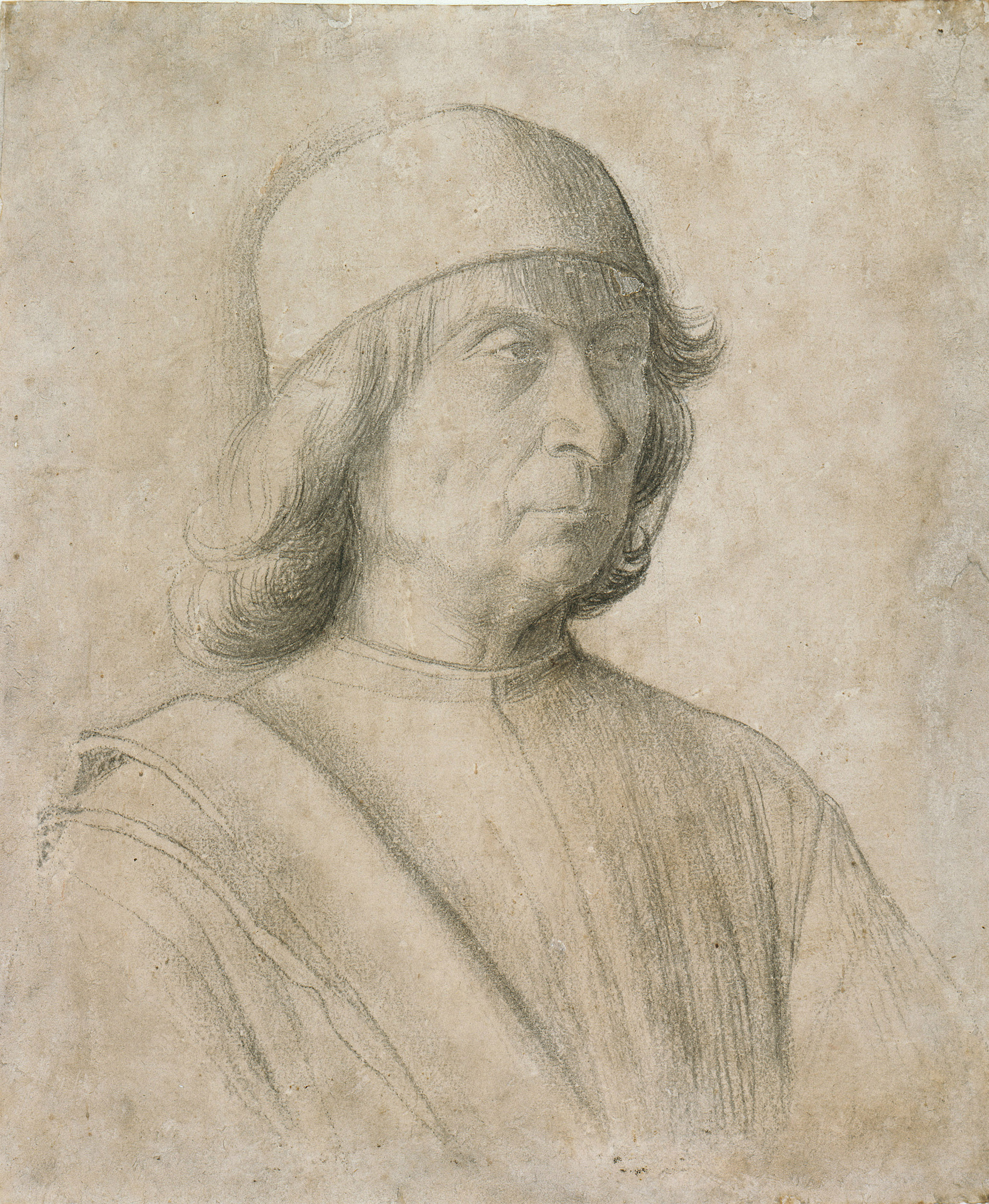
- Gentile Bellini, Self-portrait, 1496. Kupferstichkabinett, Berlin (KdZ 5170)
- Born: c. 1429; Venice, Republic of Venice
- Died: 23 February 1507; Venice, Republic of Venice
- Resting place: Basilica di San Giovanni e Paolo
- Known for: Painter, noted for portraits and paintings of Middle Eastern scenes
- Notable work: Sultan Mehmed II and others

Gentile Bellini (Venetian: Zentil Belin ; c. 1429 – 23 February 1507) was a Venetian painter of the school of Venice. He came from Venice's leading family of painters, and, at least in the early part of his career, was more highly regarded than his younger brother Giovanni Bellini - a reversal of the situation today. From 1474, he was the official portrait artist for the Doges of Venice. In addition to his portraits, he painted a number of very large works with multitudes of figures, especially for the Scuole Grandi of Venice, wealthy confraternities that were very important in Venetian patrician social life.

In 1479, he was sent to Constantinople by the Venetian government when the Ottoman Sultan Mehmed II requested an artist; he returned the next year. Thereafter, a number of his subjects were set in the East, and he is one of the founders of the Orientalist tradition in European painting. His portrait of the Sultan was also copied in paintings and prints and became known all over Europe.

== Biography ==
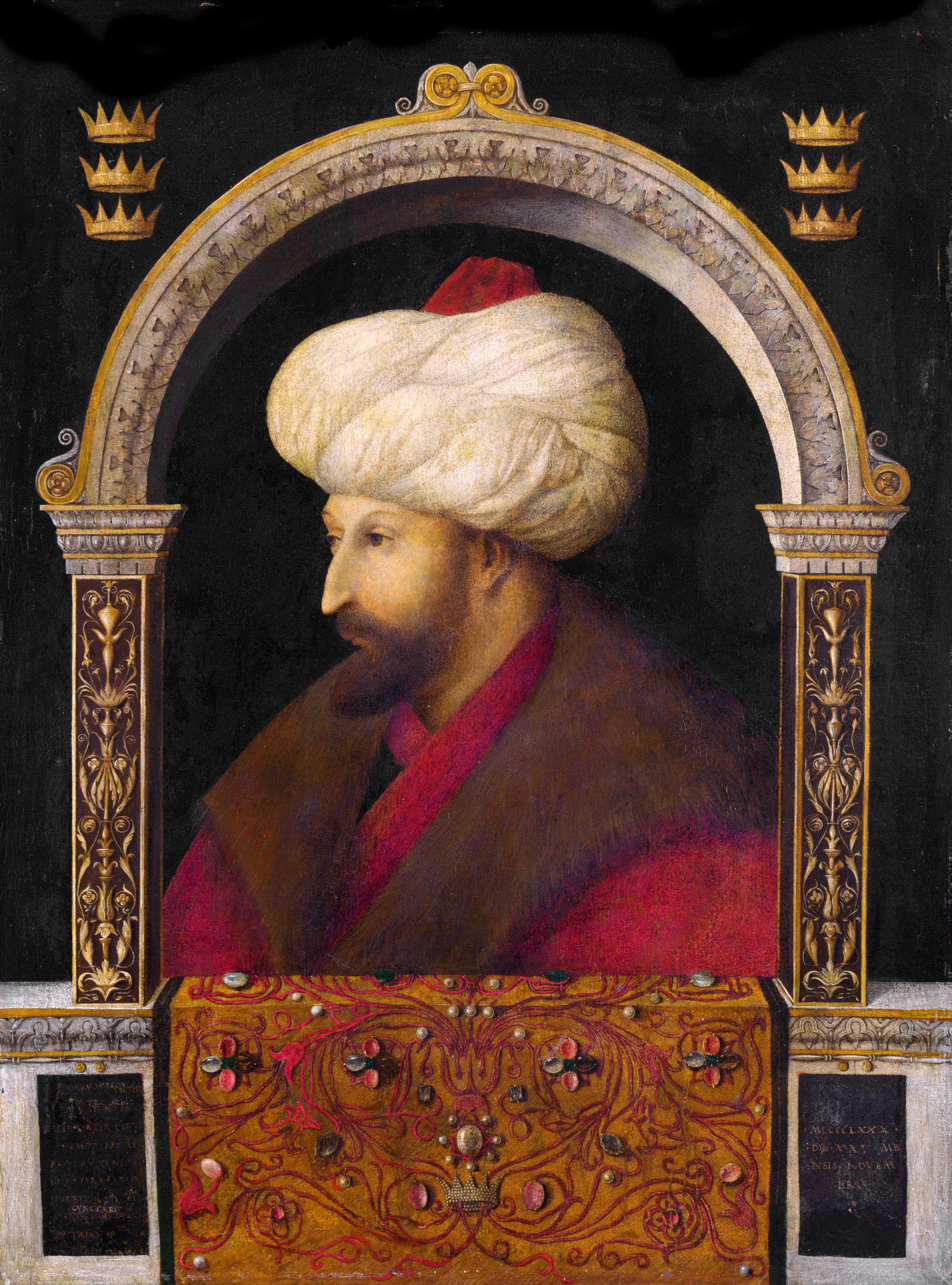
Sultan Mehmed II, 1480; oil on canvas; National Gallery, London

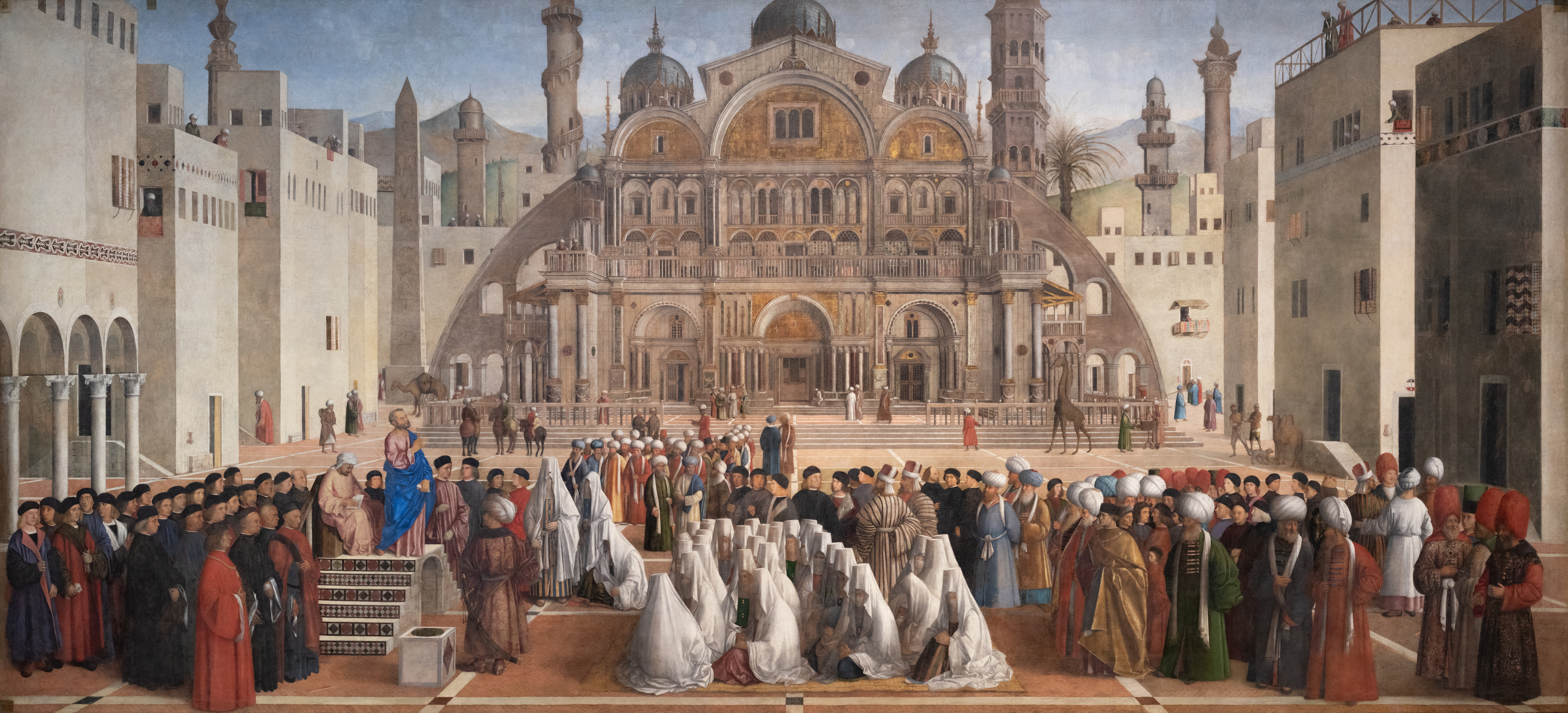
Gentile and Giovanni Bellini, St. Mark Preaching in Alexandria, 1504–7; oil on canvas; Pinacoteca di Brera, Milan

Gentile was born into the leading family of painters in Venice. His father Jacopo Bellini was a Venetian pioneer in the use of oil paint as an artistic medium; his brother was Giovanni Bellini, and his brother-in-law was Andrea Mantegna. He was christened Gentile after Jacopo's master, Gentile da Fabriano. Gentile was taught painting in the workshop of his father. Although today Gentile is often seen in the shadow of his more famous family members, in his own time he was considered among the greatest living painters in Venice and had no shortage of commissions; his talent as a portraitist revealed itself at an early age.

== Paintings ==
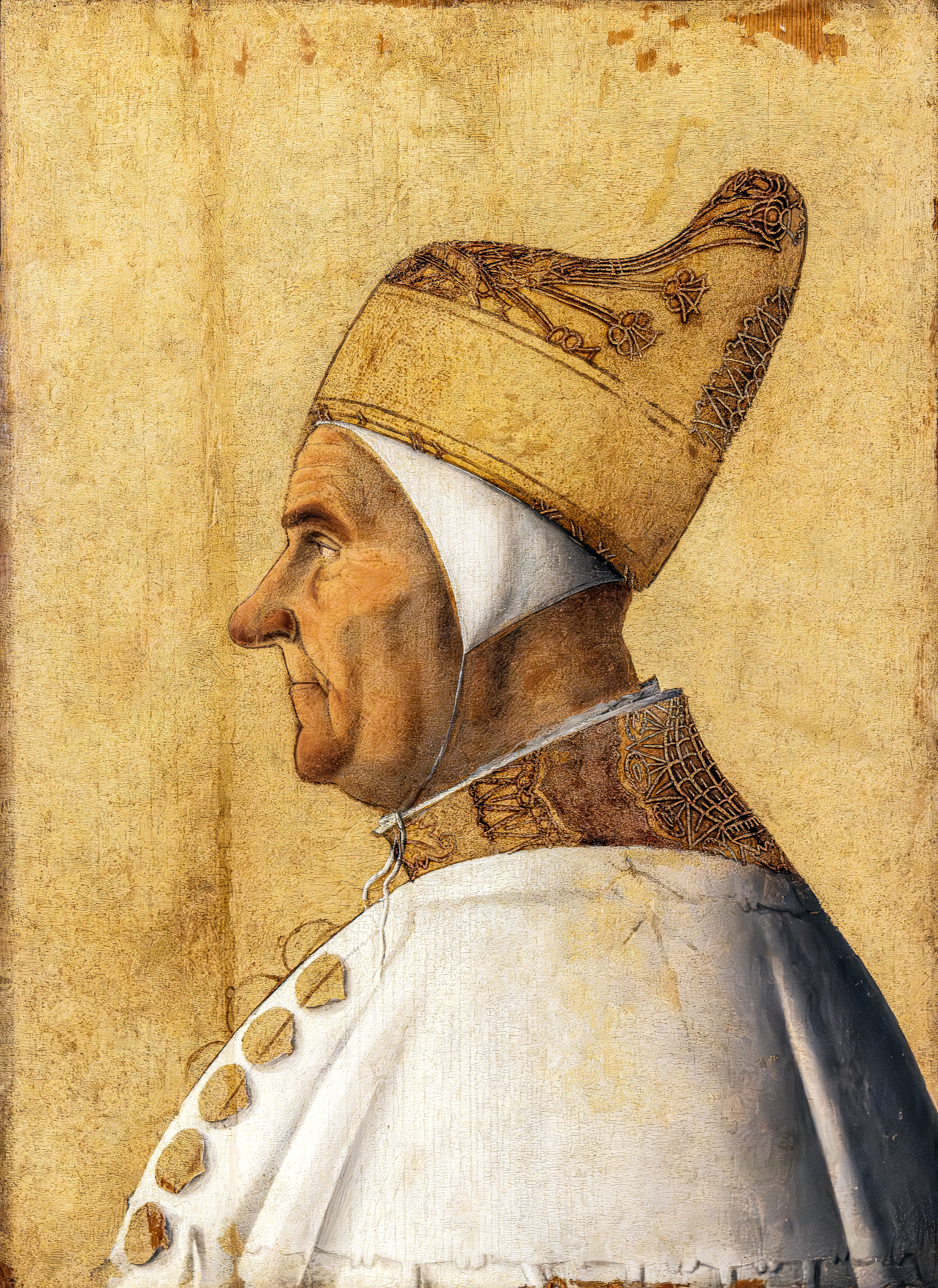
Doge Giovanni Mocenigo, c. 1478; Tempera on panel; Museo Correr, Venice

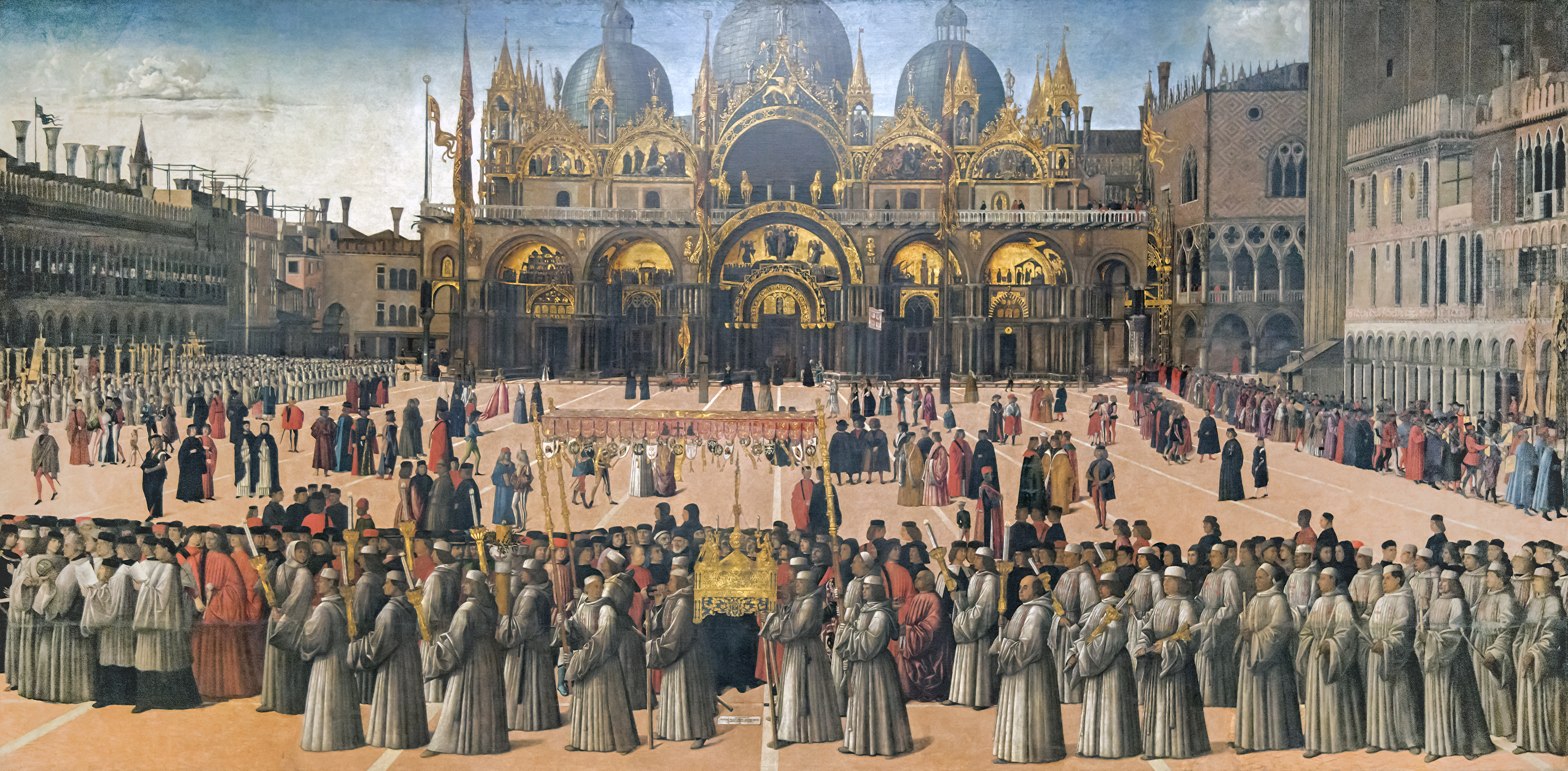
Procession of the True Cross in Piazza San Marco, 1496; tempera & oil on canvas; Accademia, Venice

Gentile's earliest signed work is The Blessed Lorenzo Giustinian (1445), one of the oldest surviving oil paintings in Venice (now at the Accademia Museum). During the 1450s, Bellini worked on a commission for the Scuola Grande di San Marco and painted in conjunction with his brother, Giovanni Bellini. From 1454 he was also the official portrait artist for the Doges of Venice, (for example, see image of the Doge Giovanni Mocenigo at right).

Much of Gentile Bellini's surviving work consists of very large paintings for public buildings, including those for the Scuola Grande di San Giovanni Evangelista. Along with Lazzaro Bastiani, Vittore Carpaccio, Giovanni Mansueti, and Benedetto Rusconi, Bellini was one of the artists hired to paint the 10-painting narrative cycle known as The Miracles of the Relic of the Cross. The commission was intended to celebrate the relic of the Holy Cross, which the confraternity had received in 1369. Gentile's contributions include the Procession of the True Cross in Piazza San Marco, which dates from 1496, and the Miracle of the True Cross at the S. Lorenzo Bridge, dating from 1500 and featuring Gentile's self-portrait and that of his brother Giovanni.

== Bellini and the East ==
Venice was, at that time, a very important point where cultures and trade bordered on the eastern Mediterranean Sea and provided gateways to Asia and Africa. As noted, in his lifetime, Gentile was the most prestigious painter in Venice. Therefore, in 1479, he was chosen by the government of Venice to work for Sultan Mehmed II in Constantinople. However, in addition to his work at the Ottoman Court, Gentile's work also responded to other aspects of the East, including the Byzantine Empire.

=== Constantinople ===
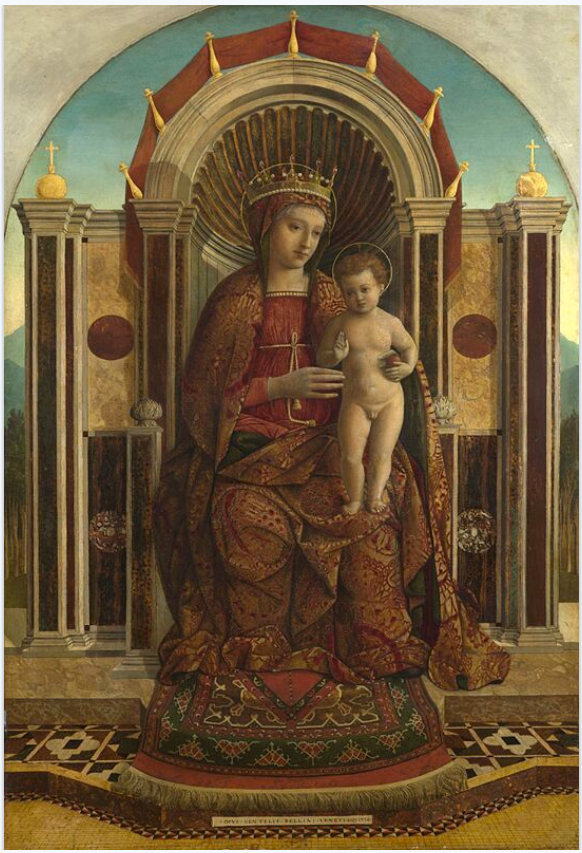
Gentile Bellini's Madonna and Child Enthroned, late 15th century. Note the Islamic prayer rug at the feet of the Virgin Mary, an example of Oriental carpets in Renaissance painting.

In September 1479, Gentile was sent by the Venetian Senate to the new Ottoman capital Constantinople as part of the peace settlement between Venice and the Turks. His role was not only as a visiting painter but also as a cultural ambassador for Venice. This was important to Mehmed II, as he was particularly interested in the art and culture of Italy, and he attempted on several occasions to have himself portrayed by Italian artists. He finally reached his goal with Gentile, who is believed to have painted the portrait of Mehmed II now in the National Gallery, London, (but largely overpainted).

Subsequently, an Oriental flavour appears in several of his paintings, including the portrait of a Turkish artist and St. Mark Preaching at Alexandria (above). The last was completed by his brother, Giovanni Bellini.

According to Carlo Ridolfi (who was born 87 years after Bellini's death) in his 1648 history of the Venetian painters:

Bellini made a painting of the head of John the Baptist on a charger, the saint being revered by the Turks as a prophet. When the picture was brought before the Sultan, he praised the skill exhibited there, but drew Gentile's attention nonetheless to an error, which was that the neck stretched out too far from the head, and as it appeared to him that Gentile appeared unconvinced, to enable him to see the natural effect, he had a slave brought to him and had his head chopped off, demonstrating to him how, once separated from the chest, the neck contracted. Gentile, fearful at such barbarities, immediately tried in every way to be released from his contract in case one day he himself should be the victim of such a joke.

This anecdote is likely apocryphal, as a similar story had been told by Seneca of Parrhasius, as well as of Michelangelo via a dubious source.

=== Greece ===
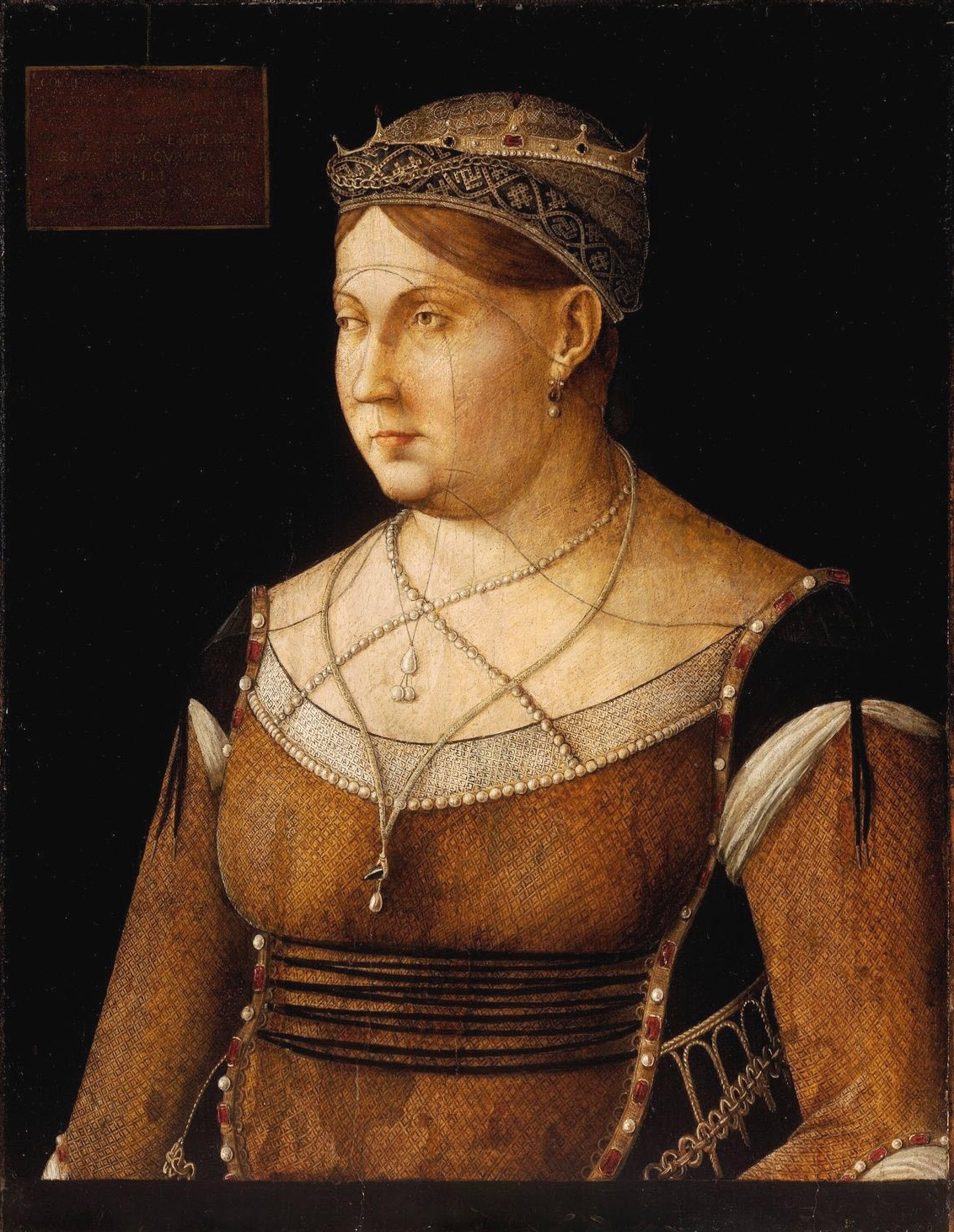
Queen Caterina Cornaro, c. 1500; Szépmüvészeti Múzeum, Budapest

Gentile responded to other aspects of the East, including the Byzantine Greek Empire, as well as Venice's other trading partners in North Africa and Levant. Venice had a long-established relationship with the Eastern Mediterranean. Saint Mark, Venice's patron, was from the Egyptian city of Alexandria, and Venice's cultural and spiritual centre – the basilica of San Marco – was built in his honour (and as his mausoleum) in the Greek Byzantine style. Although Constantinople fell to the Ottoman Turks in 1453, the Greek Byzantine world had a continuing impact upon Venetian art and culture as a number of Greek Christians fled Muslim rule. It was here that Gentile painted the portrait of Queen Caterina Cornaro of Cyprus (at right). This is counted as the second known portrait including the queen, which is now in the collection of the Szepmuveszeti Museum in Budapest.

== Retirement years and legacy ==
Bellini's most important paintings, the monumental canvases in the Doge's Palace in Venice, were destroyed by fire in 1577. Only a few of his other works remain, namely the large narrative paintings The Procession in Piazza San Marco (above left) and The Preaching of Saint Mark in Alexandria (above right), produced in his final years. Little remains of Gentile's art from the 1470s and 1480s, except for the works made in Constantinople. Moreover, many workshop paintings and drawings have been assigned to Gentile Bellini. This has had the unfortunate consequence of confirming his reputation as an awkward artist, especially in comparison with his beloved brother Giovanni. Gentile's fall from popular favour seems to have begun shortly after his death; by 1557, Lodovico Dolce made a rather acerbic comment about him as an early teacher of Titian:

Titian could not bear to follow the dry and laboured manner of Gentile... Because of this, leaving this awkward Gentile, Titian attached himself to Giovanni Bellini: but his style did not entirely please him either, and he sought out Giorgione.

He was interred in the Basilica di San Giovanni e Paolo, a traditional burial place of the doges.

In recent years, Gentile has once again generated interest, especially in a recent spate of scholarly publications and exhibitions on the subject of cross-cultural exchange between Europe and the Levant.

== Selected works ==
- Madonna Enthroned with Child (1475–1485) - National Gallery, London
- Portrait of the Doge Giovanni Mocenigo (1478–1485) - Museo Correr, Venice
- Portrait of Mehmet II (1480) - National Gallery, London
- Procession in St. Mark's Square (1496) - Gallerie dell'Accademia, Venice
- Miracle of the True Cross at the Bridge of S. Lorenzo (1500) - Gallerie dell'Accademia, Venice
- Miracle of the Reliquary of the Cross (1500)
- Portrait of Catherine Cornaro (c. 1500) - Szépmüvészeti Múzeum, Budapest
- St. Mark Preaching in Alexandria (1504–1507) - Pinacoteca di Brera, Milan
- Man with a Pair of Dividers
- St. Dominic
- The Annunciation, Thyssen-Bornemisza Museum, Madrid, Spain.

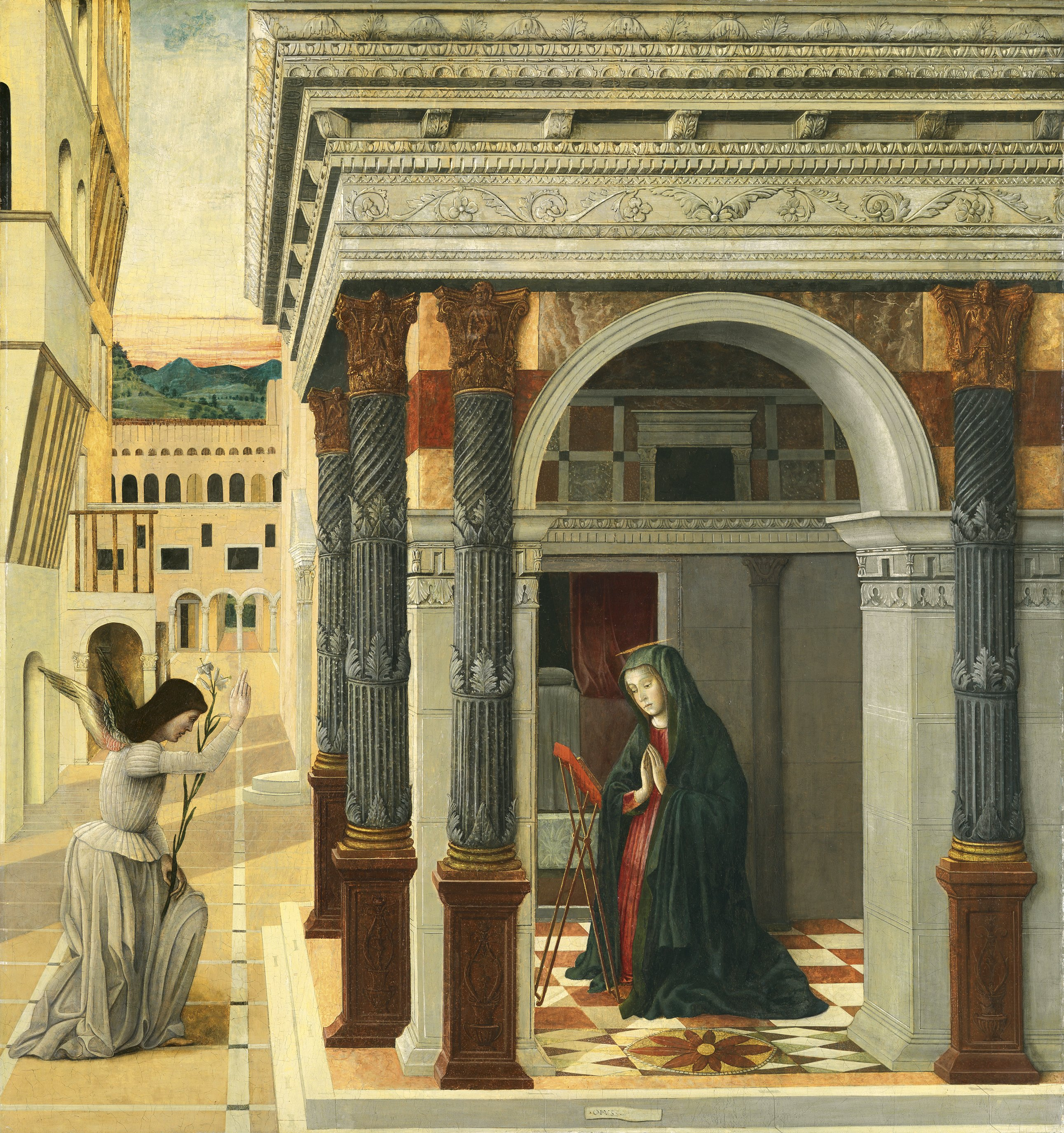
The Annunciation, Thyssen Bornemisza Museum

== Sources ==
- Hartt, Frederick, History of Italian Renaissance Art, (2nd edn.)1987, Thames & Hudson (US Harry N Abrams), ISBN 0500235104

== See also ==
- List of Orientalist artists
- Orientalism
