= Benedetto Rusconi =

Italian painter (c. 1460 – 1525)

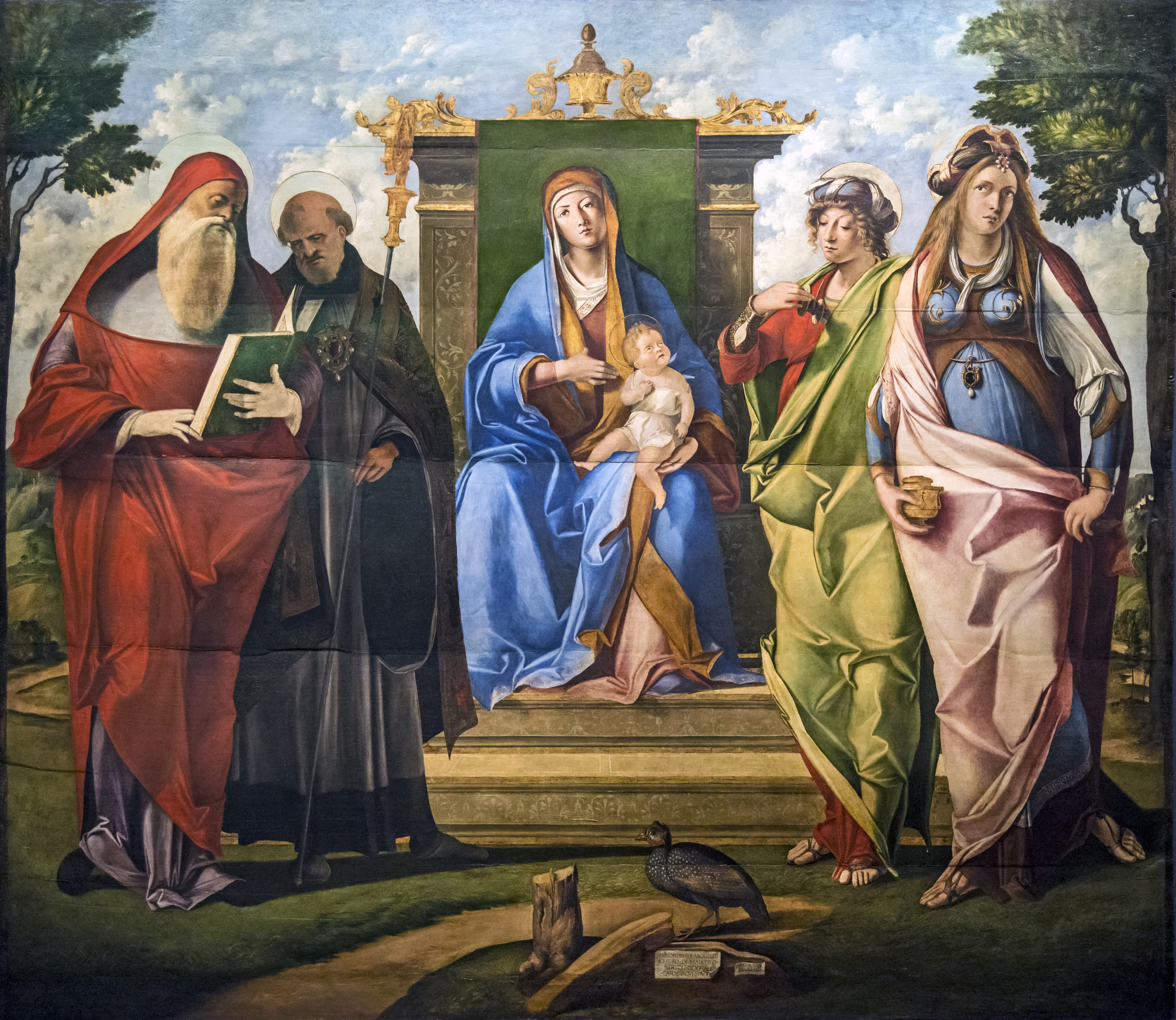
Madonna and Child with Saints Jerome, Benedict, Mary Magdalene and Justina Gallerie dell'Accademia in Venice

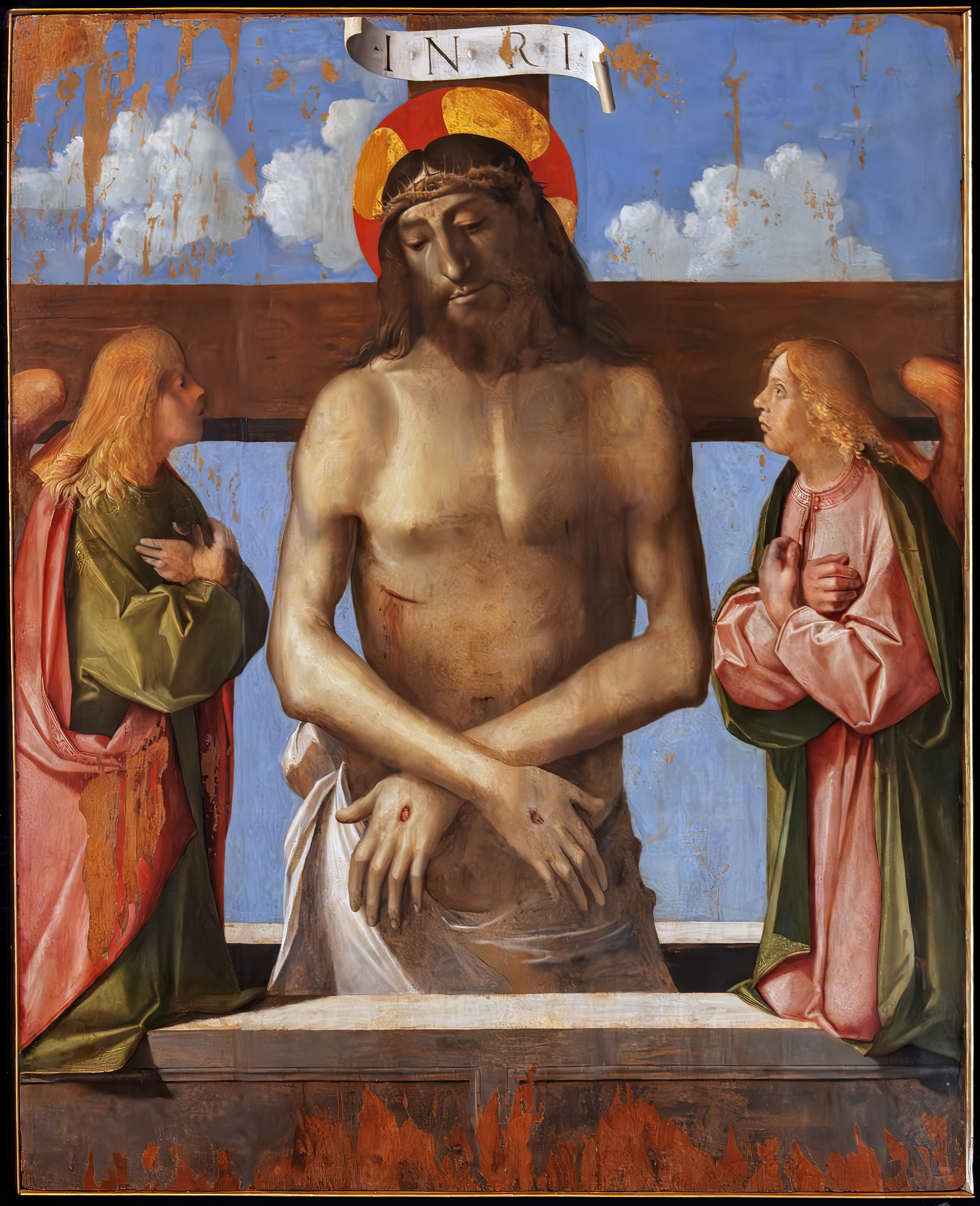
Pietà, now at the Museo Correr in Venice

Benedetto Rusconi, nicknamed the Diana, (c. 1460 – 1525) was an Italian Renaissance painter, a companion of Vittore Carpaccio and Giovanni di Niccolò Mansueti, who lived in the latter part of the 15th and early part of the 16th centuries.

He may have been a pupil of Lazzaro Bastiani. He worked both in tempera and oils. A number of his paintings are in Venice. He painted The Brethren distributing Alms, in San Giovanni Evangelista, Venice, and he assisted Lazzaro Bastiani in painting the standards on the Piazza of San Marco. In the Accademia Gallery are included his Virgin and Child, formerly in Santa Lucia at Padua, and a Transfiguration. The church of Santa Maria della Croce in Crema has an altarpiece depicting the Gift of the Miraculous Girdle to St Thomas. A Madonna and Child With St Jerome is on display at the Lowe Art Museum in Coral Gables, Florida.

The art historian Francis L. Richardson describes Rusconi's style as possessing a "formidable individuality" characterized by an emphasis on geometric forms and a "quirkiness of detail that allies [him] with such artists as Jacopo de’ Barbari and Lorenzo Lotto."
