= Giovanni di Niccolò Mansueti =

Italian painter

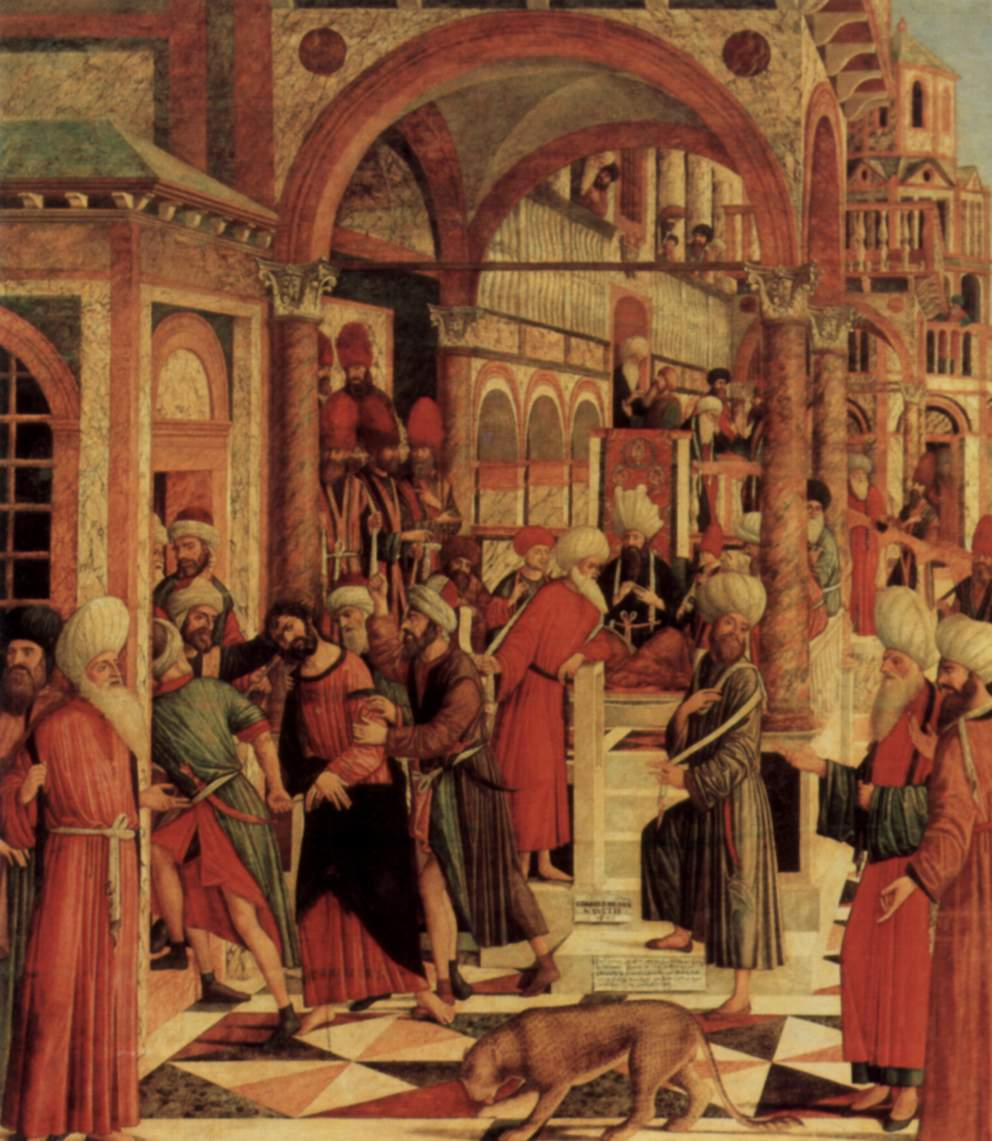
The Arrest of St. Mark from the Synagogue, 1499, Fürstlich Gemäldegalerie, Liechtenstein Museum

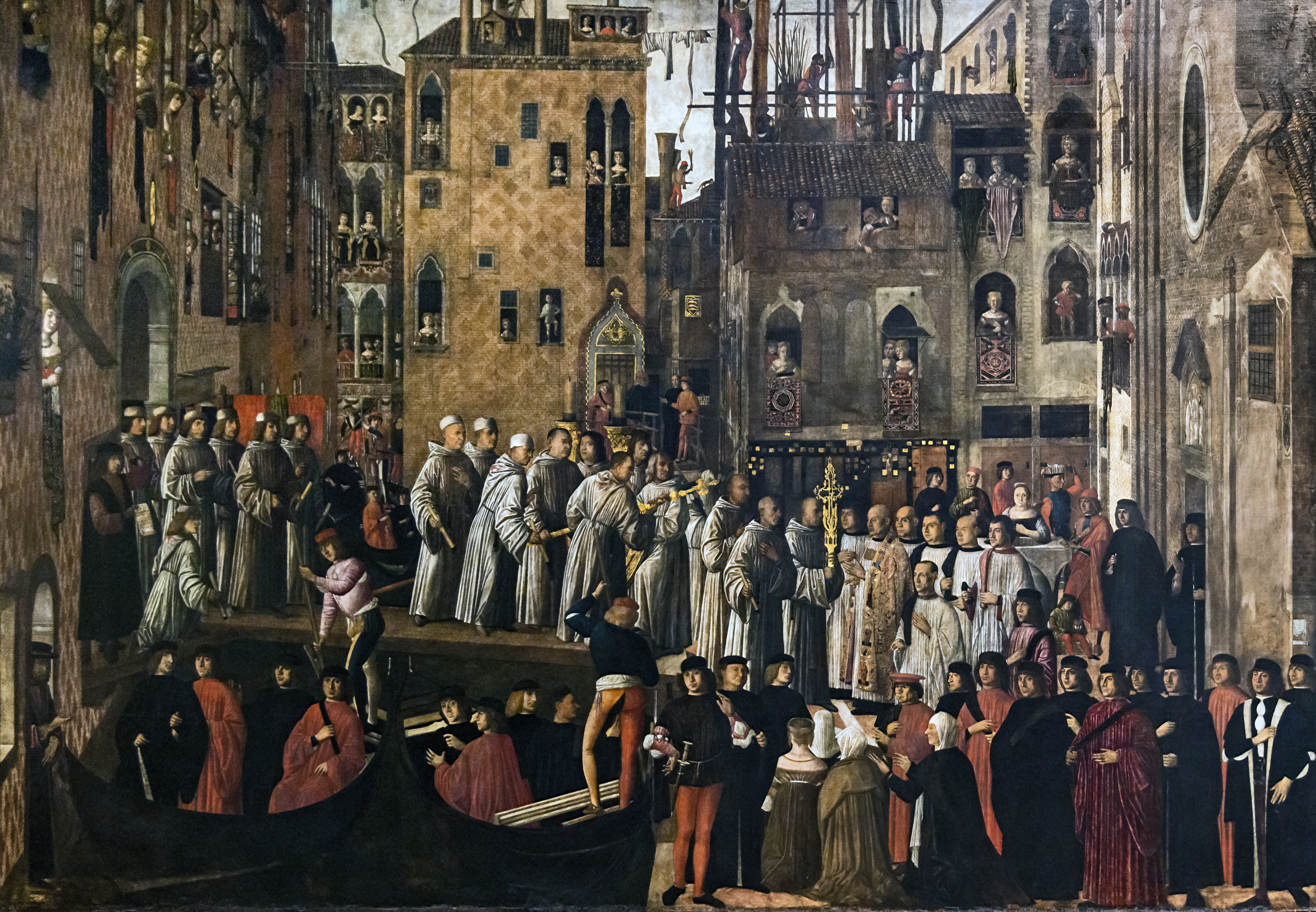
Miracle of the Relic of the Holy Cross in Campo San Lio, ca.1494, Accademia Venice

Giovanni di Niccolò Mansueti (also known as Giovanni Mansueti; c. 1465 – March 26, 1527) was an Italian painter.

Little is known of his biography. He was active in Venice from 1485 to 1526. A pupil of Gentile Bellini, he worked in the antique style in the Miracles of the Cross painted around 1496–1502 for the Scuola Grande di San Giovanni Evangelista and now in the Gallerie dell'Accademia. In style he resembles Cima da Conegliano and Vittore Carpaccio. One of his paintings resides in a church near Bagni di Lucca, Italy.

== Sources ==
- Links to other Mansueti Biographies and images of works at ArtCyclopedia.com
- Giovanni Mansueti on Artcyclopedia
