= Cartridge belt =

Cartridge belt may refer to:

- Belt (firearm), a belt for automatic feeding of ammunition into a firearm
- Bandolier, a wearable belt with pockets/inserts for cartridges
