= Beshmet =

Outer garment typical of Turkic, Mongolian, and Caucasian peoples

A beshmet (from Tatar: bişmät; Kyrgyz: beshmant; Kazakh: beshpent; Azerbaijani: beşmet) is an outer garment worn among the Turkic peoples, Mongolians and later by the peoples of the Caucasus and the Cossacks.

Beshmet is an open garment that reaches to the knees; sometimes it is quilted. It is in the form of a buttoned half-caftan with a standing collar and is gathered into folds, belted at the waist and is girded with a saber belt (which is a leather belt decorated with copper and silver plaques) to which a dagger or saber was attached. Beshmet tightly fits the chest and waist, and the sleeves are long and narrow. The length is slightly above the knees or knee-length, with a back cut at the waist, straight solid floors fastened to the waist with a hook, with side wedges. It was worn under caftans such as chokha or chekmen, but in everyday life it could be worn on its own. It shares similarities with the arkhalig, although, arkhalig is worn as a jacket while beshmet is more comparable to a tunic.

The beshmet was a part of uniform of all Cossack troops, it was worn according to color and cut. During off-duty time, the Cossacks could wear beshmets of any color and material. Beshmets were used both as streetwear and at home. Young Cossacks wore beshmets in the summer during festivities and holidays. Old Cossacks wore beshmets quilted on cotton at home. Beshmets were usually made of fabrics such as silk, satin, velvet or other materials such as wool, brocade etc. Elderly Cossacks wore beshmets of blue, black, brown colors, while young wore red, burgundy, green, and blue.
