= Cartridge box =

Box to carry firearm ammunition

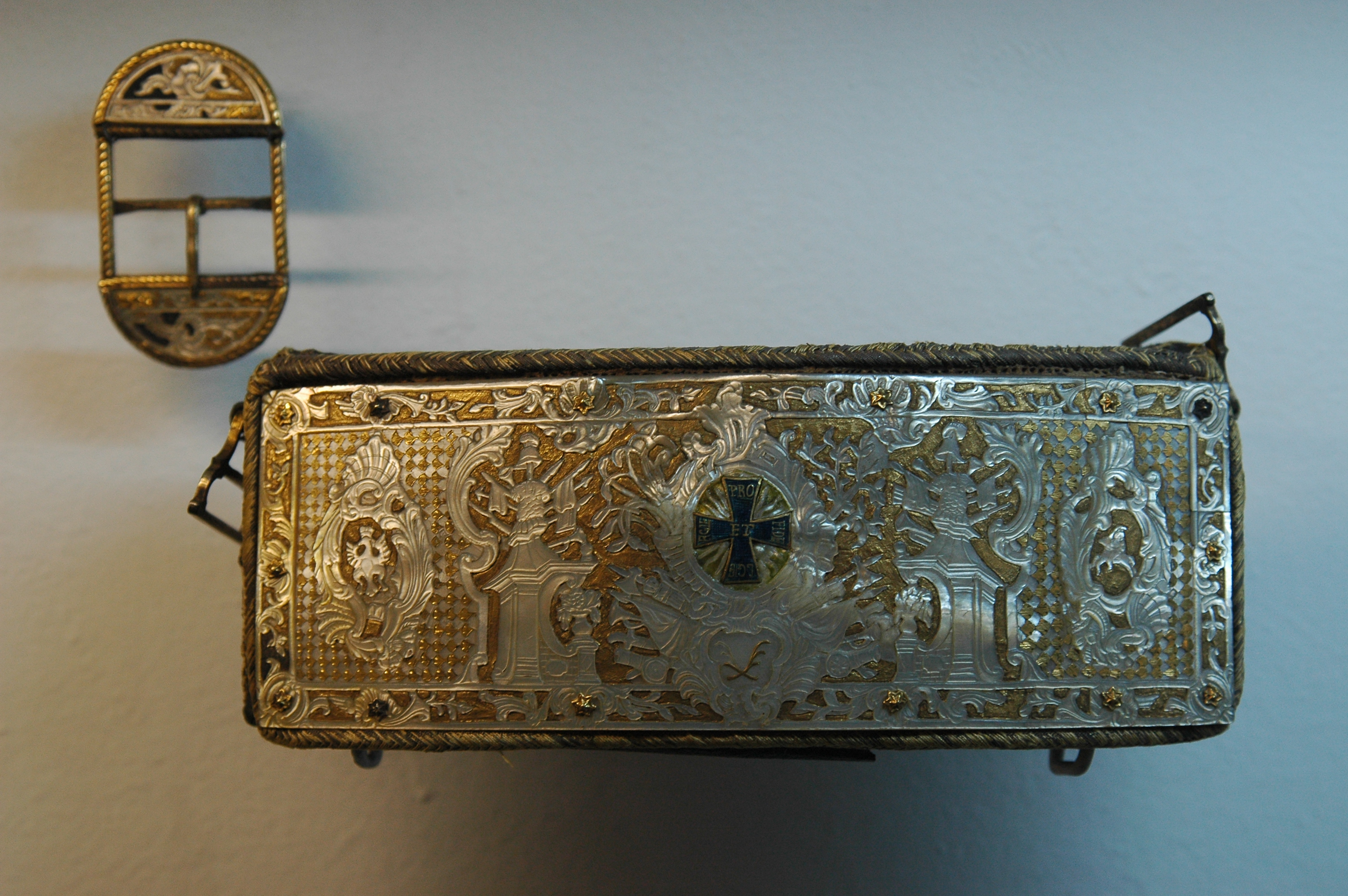
A ventral cartridge box

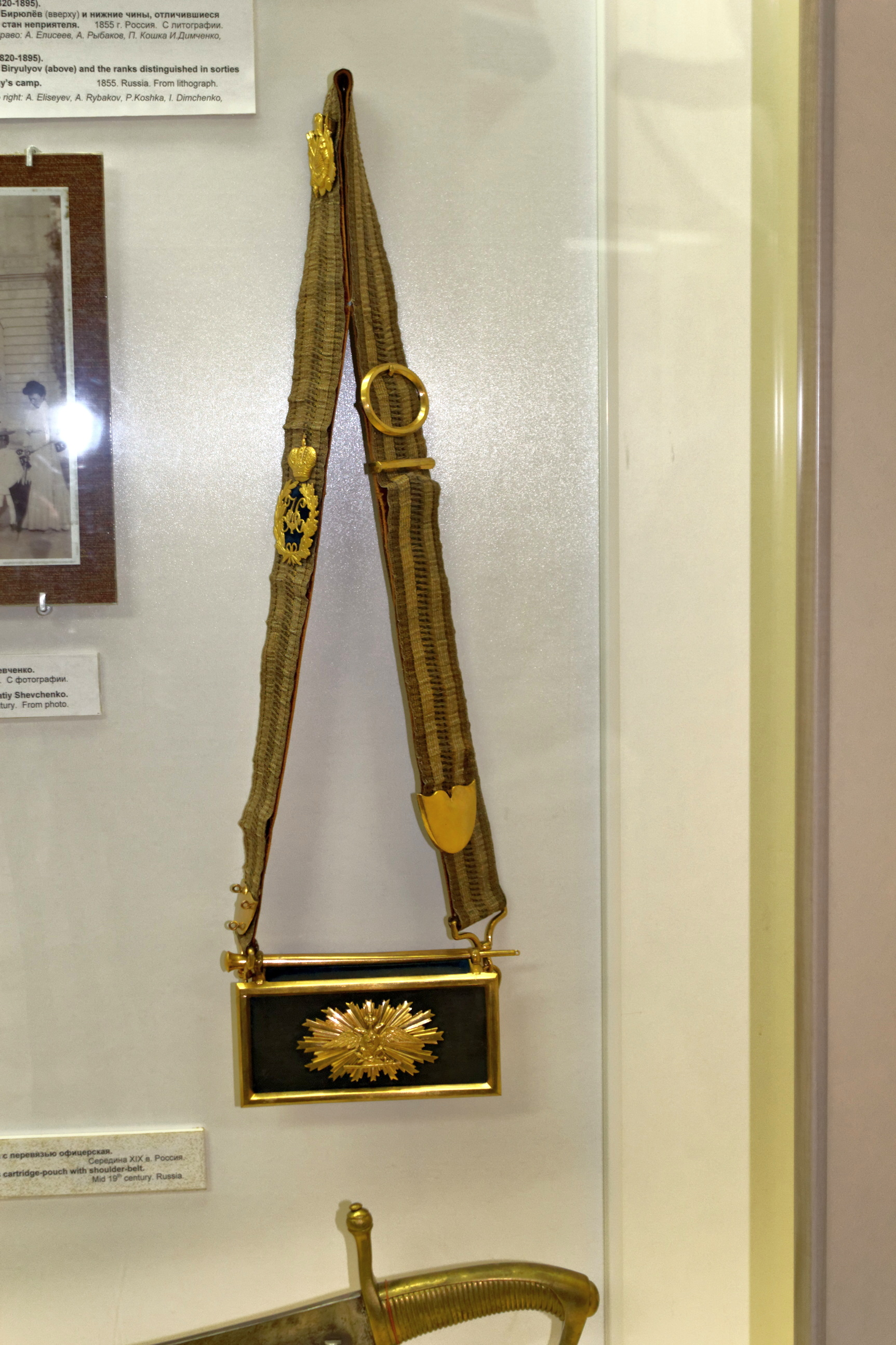
A shoulder belt cartridge box

A cartridge box is a container used to carry firearm cartridges. It was worn on a soldier's right hip, on a belt in front of the soldier's abdomen ("ventral cartridge box", "gargoussier"), or on a shoulder belt.

== See also ==
- Bandolier
- Gazyr
