= Chepken =

Caftan worn among Turkic people and the Cossacks

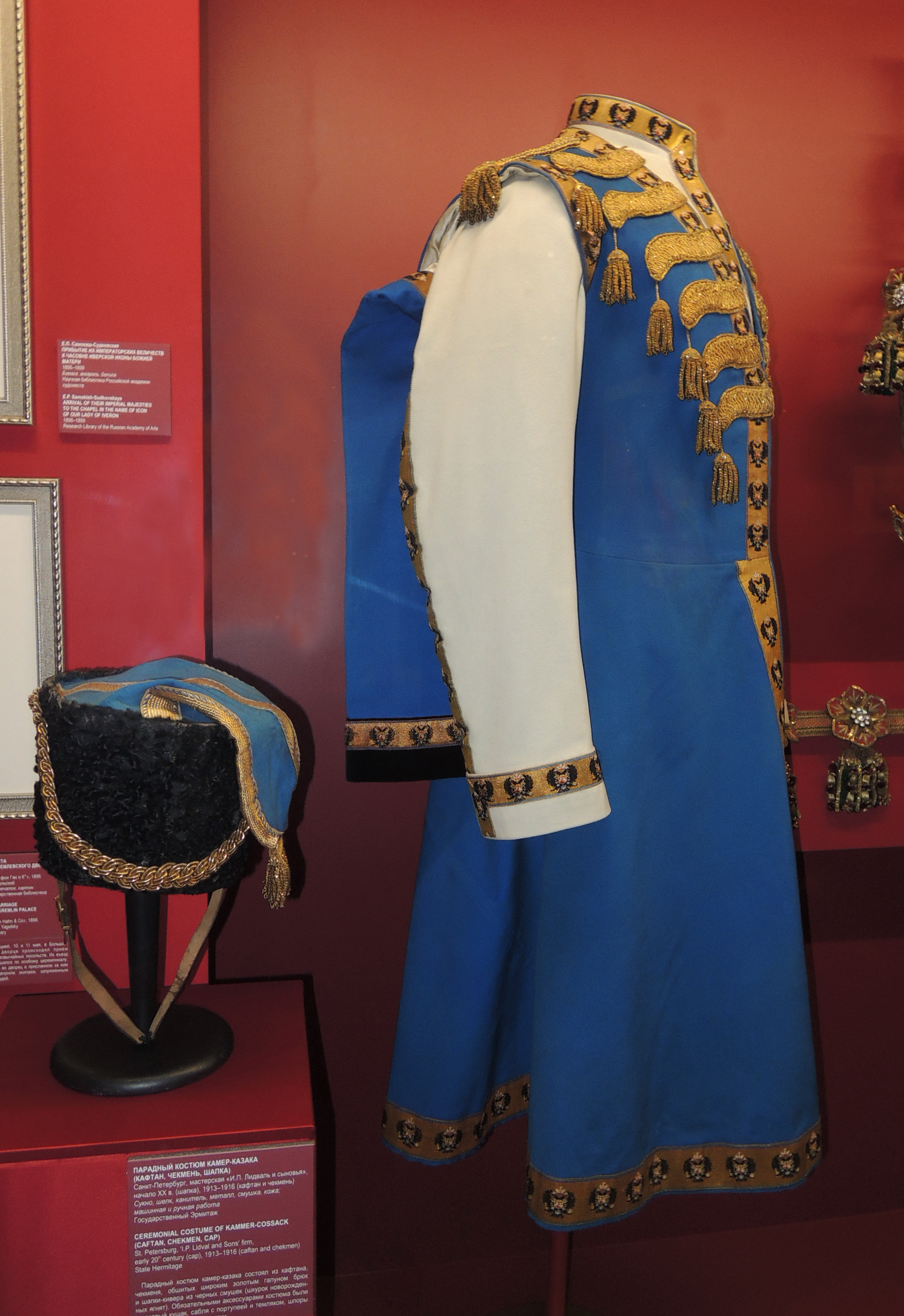
Cossack chekmen

Chepken or chekmen (Tatar: чепкен / çepken "outerwear"; Karachay-Balkar: чепкен, romanized: çepken; Kumyk: чепген, romanized: çepgen; Russian: чекмень; Nogai: шепкен, romanized: şepken; Azerbaijani: çəpkən; Turkish: cepken) is a caftan worn among Turkic people and later by the Cossacks. It was also in wide use among Caucasians.

== Description ==
The clothing is in a transitional form between a robe and a fitting caftan without collar and most often made of cloth. The word "chepken" was used among Turkic groups in North Caucasus to refer to chokha and was often synonymous with that attire.

Among Azerbaijanis "chepken" is a type of lined upper shoulder clothing with long false sleeves. Chepkens were mainly sewn from cloth, velour or velvet as well as various silk brocade fabrics. It was worn mainly by women, but there is also a male version of this clothing. Depending on the age of the women, the colors of the chepkens varied. Young girls and women usually wore yellow, red or green, and older women wore white or black shirts. Chepkens were often sewn with cut linings that fit snugly to the body. In the lower side part of the clothes there was a detail called "chapyg" Azerbaijani: çapıq - "scar". They wore a chepken over a shirt, so it fitted well to the body. On the sides, the chepken had sleeves ending in armlets. Buttons were sometimes sewn to the sleeves.

== Etymology ==
The word "chepken" is of Turkic origin and has analogues in related Turkic languages, such as "chikman" and "chikpen" that translate to "chikmyan" in Tatar and Bashkir. In Turkmen "chepken" translates to 'cloth' and indicates the material from which this type of clothing was traditionally made. Kuban Cossacks called this kind of clothing "chekmen" and Circassians called it "shepken".

== Gallery ==
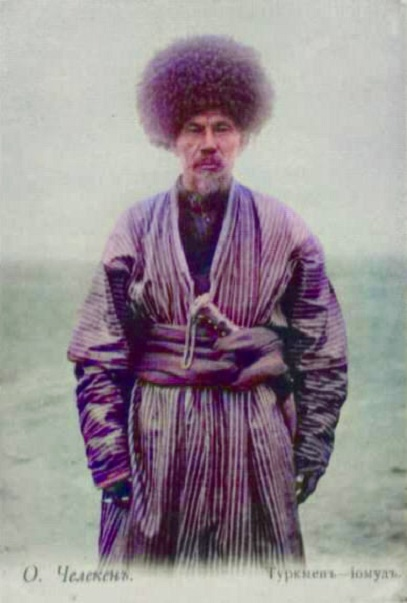
Turkmen in chepken.

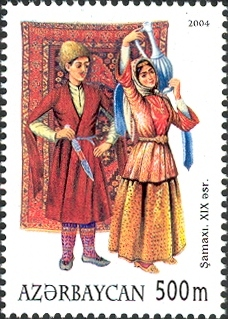
Azerbaijani stamp depicting a couple wearing chepkens.

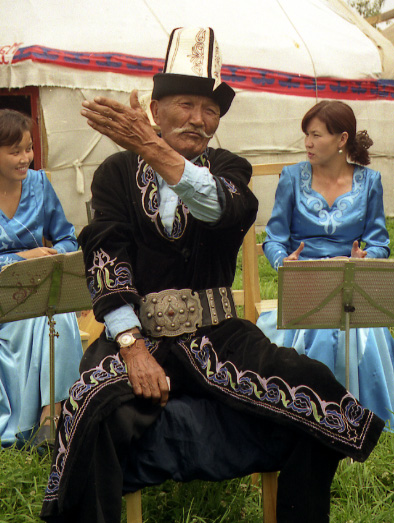
Kyrgyz man in traditional attire which includes chepken.
