= Baldric =

Belt worn over one shoulder to carry a weapon or other implement

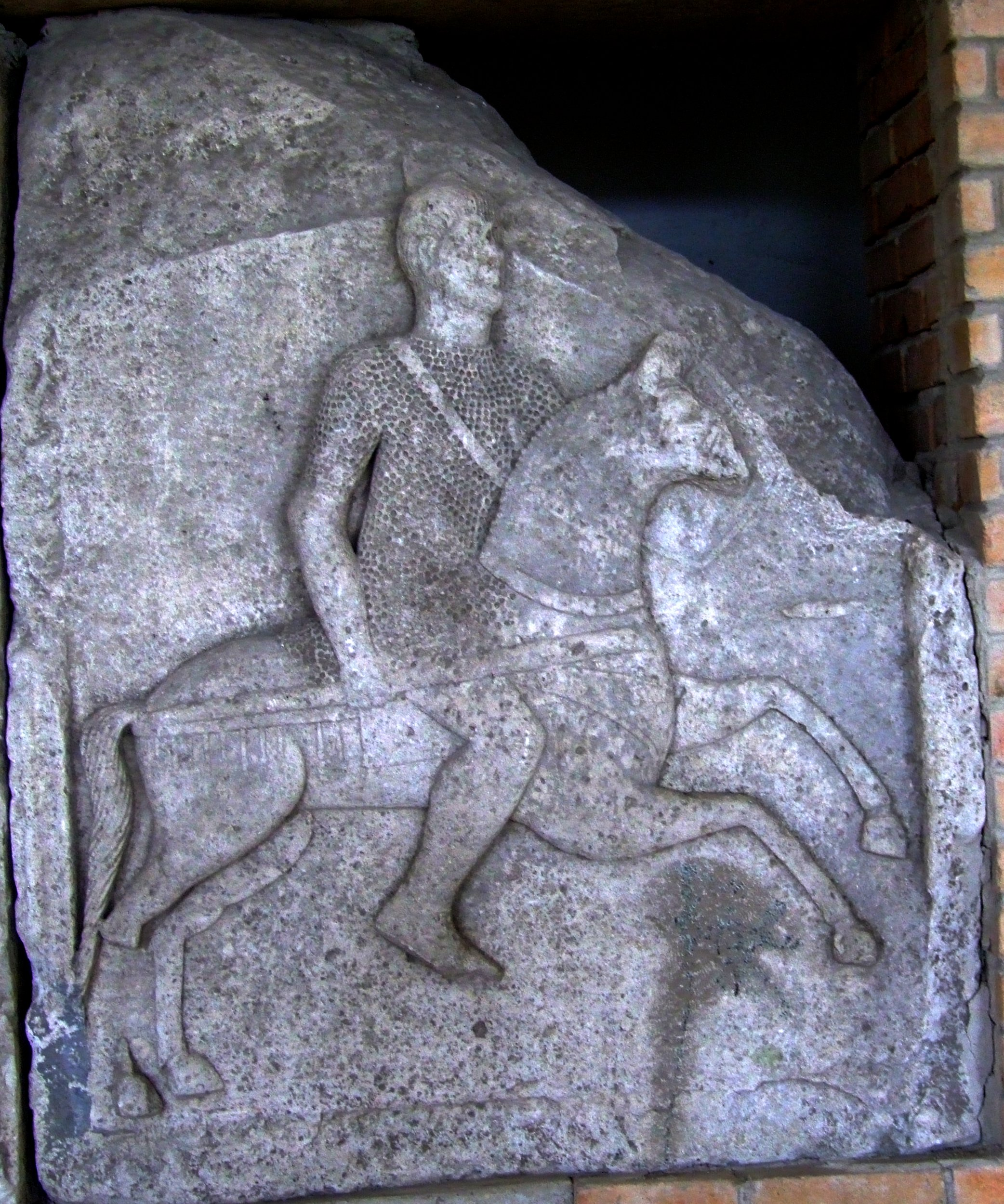
A cavalryman wearing a mail shirt with a baldric over his right shoulder, from the Roman Tropaeum Traiani, built 109 AD in the area of present-day Romania.

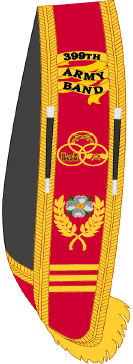
U.S Army band baldric

A baldric (also baldrick, bawdrick, bauldrick as well as other rare or obsolete variations) is a belt worn over one shoulder that is typically used to carry a weapon (usually a sword) or other implement such as a bugle or drum. The word may also refer to any belt in general, but this usage is poetic or archaic. In modern contexts, military drum majors usually wear a baldric.

== Usage ==
Baldrics have been used since ancient times, usually as part of military dress. The design offers more support for weight than a standard waist belt, without restricting movement of the arms, and while allowing easy access to the object carried. Alternatively, and especially in modern times, the baldric may fill a ceremonial role rather than a practical one. Most Roman tombstones in the third century had depictions of white baldrics.

== Design ==
One end of the baldric was broad and finished in a straight edge, while the other was tapered to a narrow strip. The narrow end was brought through a scabbard runner, it was probably wrapped around the scabbard twice. Circular metal discs called Phalera were attached to the broad end. Four leather baldrics were found in Vimose and Thorsbjerg. One of these measured 118 long and 8 cm wide.

== Roman balteus ==
In Ancient Rome the balteus (plural baltei) was a type of baldric commonly used to suspend a sword. It was a belt generally worn over the shoulder, passing obliquely down to the side, typically made of leather, often ornamented with precious stones, metals or both. There was also a similar belt worn by the Romans, particularly by soldiers, called a cintus (pl. cinti) that fastened around the waist. The word accintus meaning a soldier (literally, "girt" as for battle) attests to this differing usage.

== Today ==
Many non-military or paramilitary organisations include baldrics as part of ceremonial dress. The Knights of Columbus 4th Degree Colour Corps uses a baldric as part of their uniform; it supports a ceremonial sword.

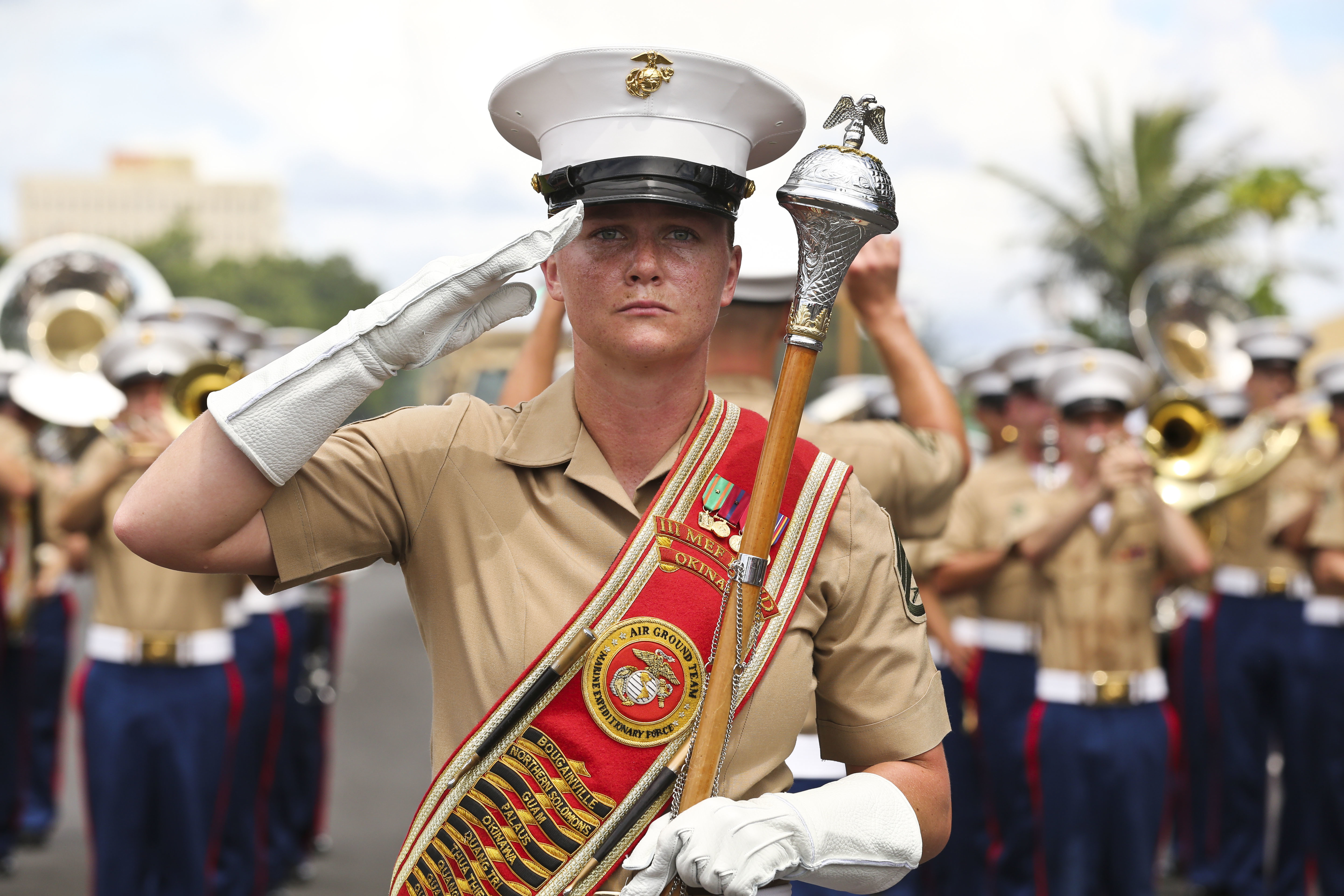
A drum major of the United States' III Marine Expeditionary Forces Band is pictured wearing a baldric in 2019

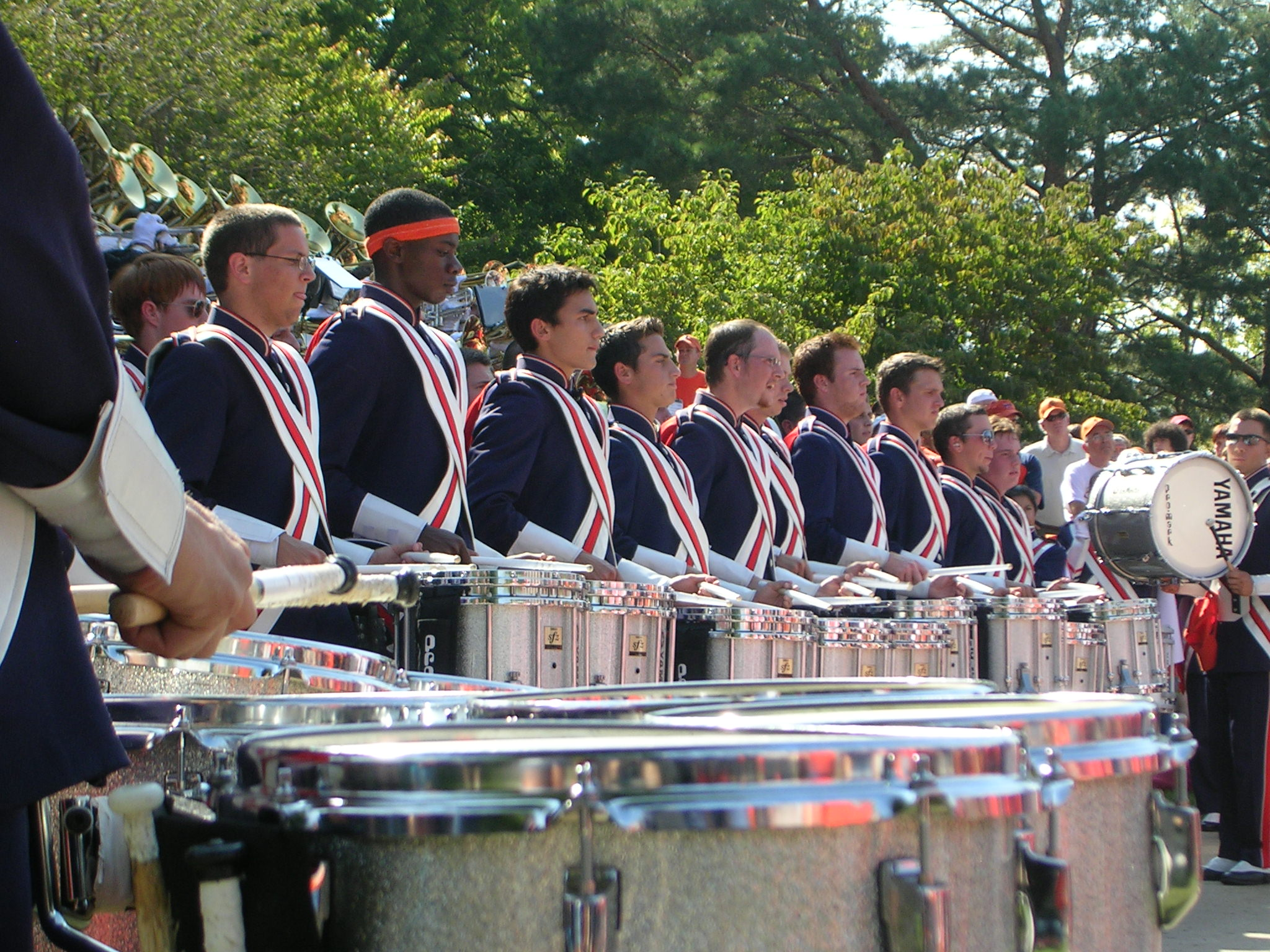
The Marching Illini Drumline with double baldrics

The University of Illinois Marching Illini wore two baldrics as a part of their uniform until 2009, with one over each shoulder. They crossed in the front and back and were buttoned onto the jacket beneath a cape and epaulets. Today, one baldric with two sides is worn.

A crossed pair of baldrics is often worn as part of the uniform of Morris dancers; different coloured baldrics help to distinguish different sides.

== In literature and culture ==
Baldrics appear in the classical literary canon, and later in fantasy and science fiction genres.

- The decorated baldric of Pallas plays a key part in the Aeneid, leading Aeneas to kill Turnus. (1st century BC)
- In Sir Gawain and the Green Knight Gawain returns from his battle with the Green Knight wearing the green girdle "obliquely, like a baldric, bound at his side,/ below his left shoulder, laced in a knot, in betokening the blame he had borne for his fault." (14th century)
- The yeoman in Chaucer's Canterbury Tales is described as wearing a "baldrick of bright green." (14th century)
- Benedick, from William Shakespeare's Much Ado About Nothing, says "But that I will have a recheat winded in my forehead or hang my bugle in an invisible baldric all women shall pardon me." (16th century)
- Britomart, in Edmund Spenser's Faerie Queene, clothes herself in a borrowed armour "with brave bauldrick garnished" before embarking on her quest (Book III, canto iii,). (16th century)
- A baldric features prominently in Chapter 4 of Alexandre Dumas' The Three Musketeers. (19th century)
- Walter Scott in Ivanhoe published in 1819 describes a Yeoman "with a baldric and a badge of silver". (19th century)
- In The Fellowship of the Ring, Boromir is described: "On a baldric he wore a great horn tipped with silver that now was laid upon his knees." (20th century)
- A baldrick is also mentioned in the epic poem by Alfred, Lord Tennyson; The Lady of Shalott; in the tenth stanza: 'And from his blazon'd baldric slung, A mighty silver bugle hung'. (19th century, from 13th century)
- Some species and factions such as Klingons wear baldrics in Star Trek, such as Kor, Koloth, Kang or Worf although sometimes they are referred to as a sash. The character Worf does so in almost every one of his appearances through two series and four films. In The Next Generation episode "Conundrum", Worf, due to amnesia, mistakenly believes that the baldric indicates his rank or authority, so he briefly assumes command of the Enterprise. (20th century)
- Baldrick is a character played by Tony Robinson in the BBC comedy series Blackadder. (20th century)
- Pirates of the Caribbean features baldrics worn by many characters including Jack Sparrow, Elizabeth Swann, Will Turner, Hector Barbossa, Davy Jones, Blackbeard, and Angelica.
- Doctor Who features Silurian warrior Vastra and human maid Jenny Flint use baldrics to carry katana.

== See also ==
- Baldrick (Blackadder character)
- Bandolier
- Sam Browne belt
- Sash
- Shoulder belt
- Webbing
