= Shoulder belt (military) =

Belt worn usually over the right shoulder and across the body

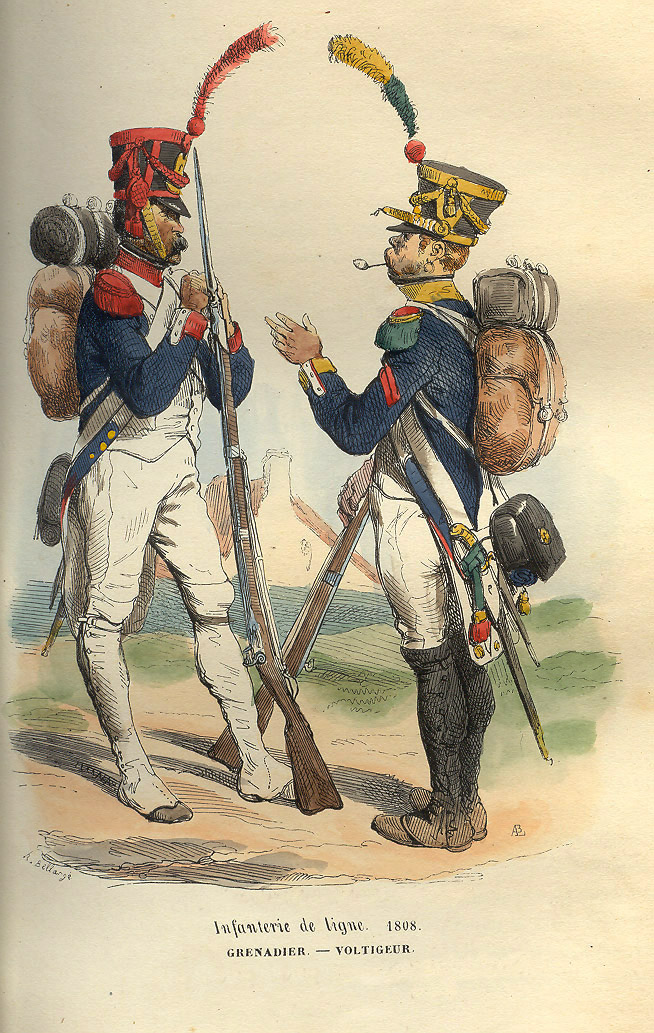
Illustration of a grenadier and voltigeur of the French Imperial Army wearing full laden shoulder belts in 1808

In military uniforms, a shoulder belt is a wide belt worn usually over the shoulder and across the body. With nearly all line infantry, skirmishers, light infantry, grenadiers and guard regiments, two shoulder belts were worn - one carrying the cartridge box, and another for the bayonet, a sword ("sword belt" was also the term in this case), or other military equipment.

A shoulder belt was worn in various configurations, depending on army and rank. For example, an officer may have only worn one shoulder belt as appropriate for only having a pistol. A light horseman may have also worn one shoulder belt, for their cartridge pouch.

Initially shoulder belts had buckles. In the second half of the 18th century the British army replaced buckles with shoulder belt plates. The latter ones were solid metal plates fixed with two studs to one end of the belt and used a hook to pass through one of several holes by the other end. This arrangement allowed for quick readjustment and a more neat appearance. Officers used to wear fancy gold and silver plates with elaborate engravings. Soldiers wore brass plates, usually with numerical or other design indicative of their regiment.

== Cross belt ==
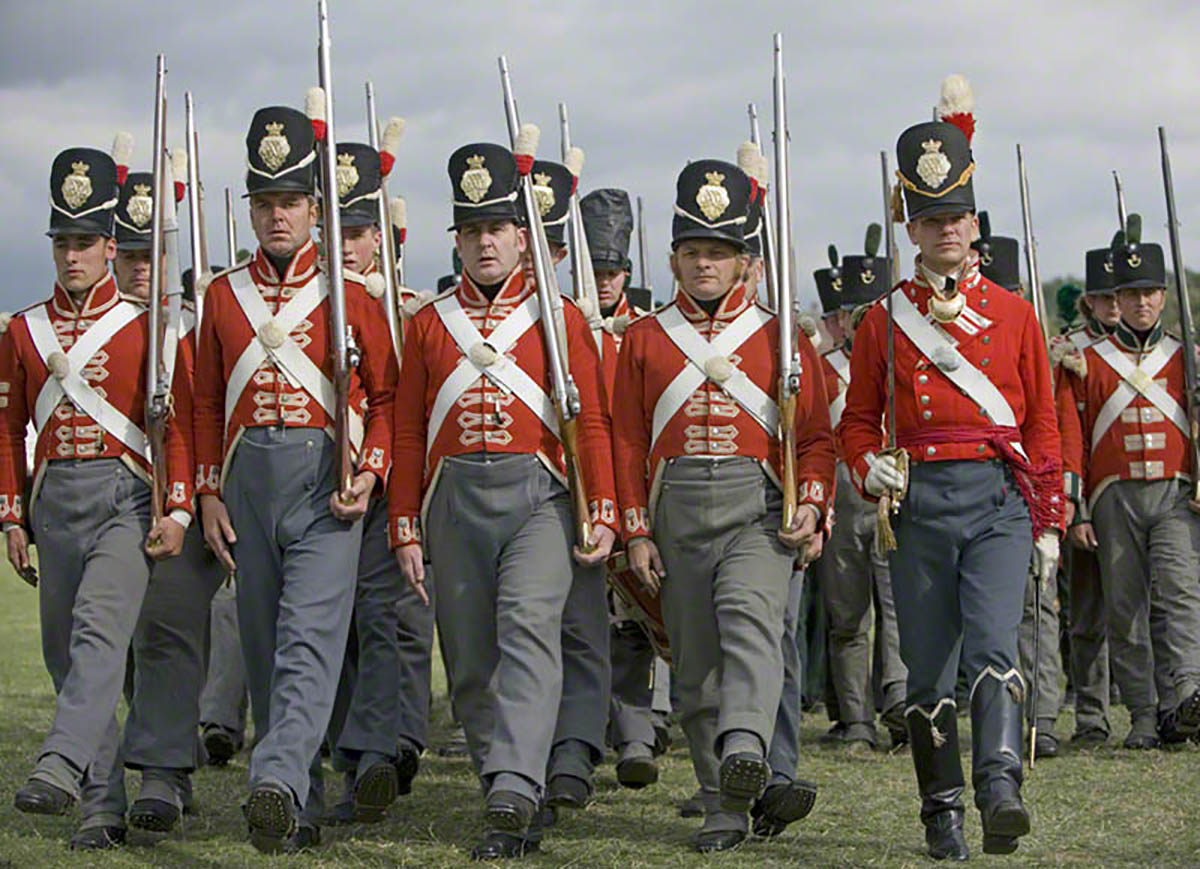
Historical reenactors portraying the British 33rd Regiment of Foot. The line infantrymen wear white cross belts with belt plates, while the officer on the right wears a single shoulder belt to his left hip which carries his sabre's scabbard.

A cross belt is two connected straps worn across the body to distribute the weight of loads, carried at the hip, across the shoulders and trunk. It is similar to two shoulder belts joined with a single buckle at the center of the chest. The cross belt was predominantly used from the 1700s (American Revolutionary War) to the 1840s – they were not part of a soldier's equipment in the American Civil War and Anglo-Zulu War/First Boer War.

For most line infantry, skirmishers, light infantry, grenadiers and guard regiments during much of Europe's Age of Gunpowder, either a cross belt or two shoulder belts were worn. One configuration for the belts would be the cartridge box on the right hip and sword scabbard on the left. Such equipment would be attached to the belt at its lowest point, where it rests on the hip. Officers almost never carried muskets or rifles, so they typically wore only one shoulder belt, such as for the pistol cartridge box or for a sabre scabbard. As officers were often aristocratic and used many independent symbols for their family, rank, and command, their uniforms and gear organisation could be highly variable.

For British infantry, the cross belt had a metal belt plate with the regiment of the soldier inscribed on it.

== Pouch belt ==
From the early 1800s light cavalry officers in the British Army adopted the practice of wearing single belts across the chest and back, holding a pouch on the right hip. The pouch was subsequently moved to the back and the leather belt was decorated with gold or silver braiding varying according to regimental practice. Officers of Rifle regiments also wore pouch-belts holding the unit distinctions and honours, which in other infantry appeared on flags.

These ornamental pouch-belts continued to be worn as part of the officers' full dress of hussars, the Royal Engineers, and Rifles until 1939, and survive in the modern units descended from these regiments.

== See also ==
- Baldric
- Bandolier
- Shoulder insignia
- Sam Browne belt
- Epaulet
