= Chokha =

High-necked wool coat worn by men in the Caucasus

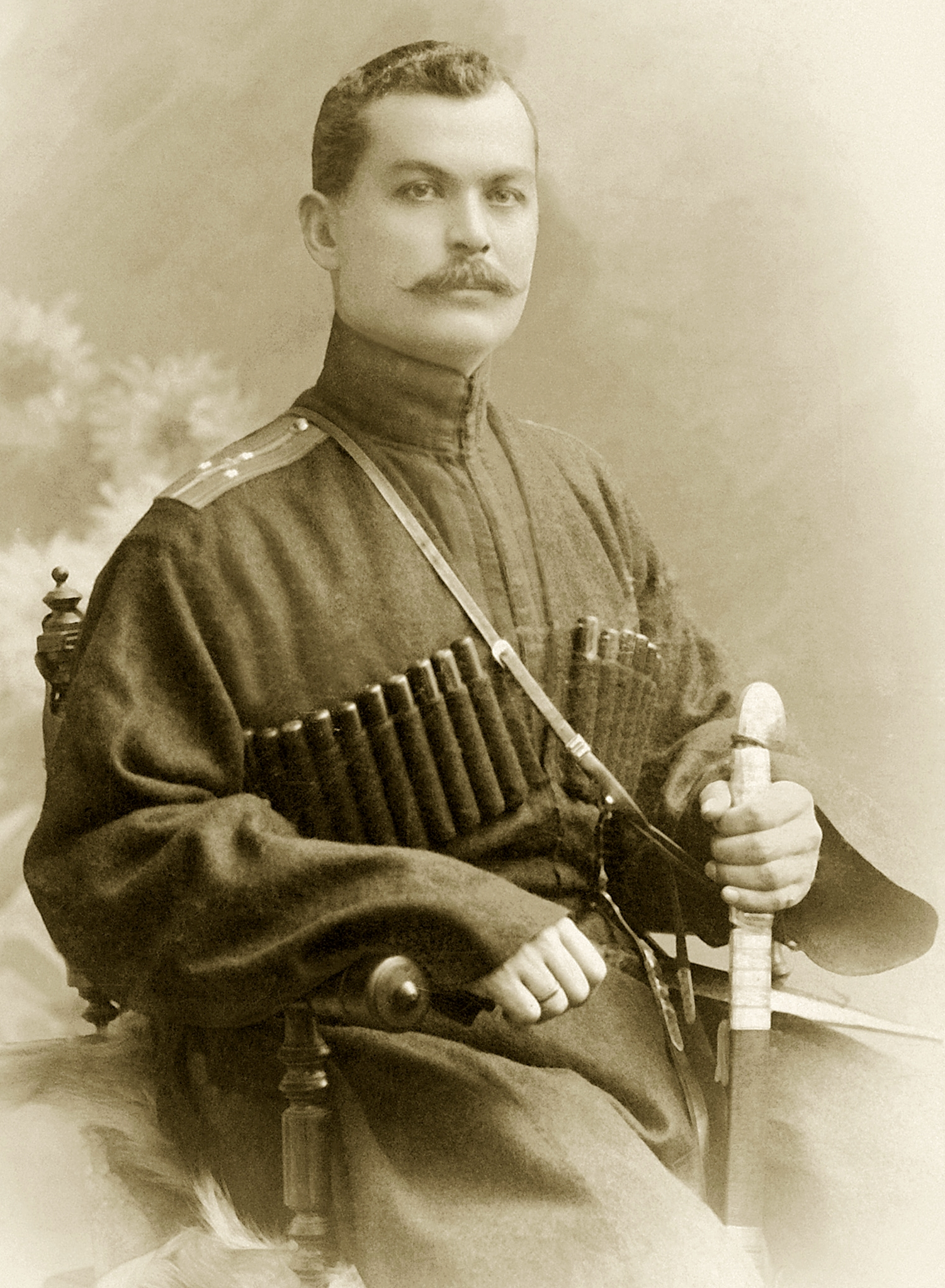
Georgian nobleman Constantine Gelovani wearing a chokha with military shoulder marks

A chokha (Note: Abkhaz: акәымжәы, romanized: akwymžwy, IPA: [ɑkʰʷəmˈʒʷə]; Adyghe: цые, romanized: cye, IPA: [tsɘˈjɜ]; Armenian: չուխայ, romanized: chuxay, IPA: [tʃʰuˈχɑj]; Azerbaijani: چوخا, romanized: çuxa, IPA: [tʃuˈχɑ]; Bats: ჩოჴაჸო̆, romanized: čoqaʾŏ, IPA: [tʃʰɔqʰaʔɔ̆]; Chechen: чокхиб, romanized: çoqib, IPA: [ˈtʃʰɔqʰɪb̥]; Georgian: ჩოხა, romanized: chokha, IPA: [tʃʰɔχa]; Greek: τσόχα, romanized: tsócha, IPA: [ˈts̠oxa]; Ingush: чокхи, romanized: çoqi, IPA: [ˈtʃʰɔqʰɪ]; Kabardian: цей, romanized: cei, IPA: [tseː]; Karachay-Balkar: чепкен, romanized: çepken; Kumyk: чепген, romanized: çepgen; Laz: ჩოხა, romanized: çoxa; Lezgian: чуха, romanized: çuxa; Mingrelian: ჩოხა, romanized: čoxa; Nogai: шепкен, romanized: şepken; Iron Ossetic: цухъхъа, romanized: cuqqa, IPA: [ˈ(t)suqːa]; Persian: چوقا, romanized: côqâ, IPA: [tʃoːˈqɒː]; Russian: черкеска, romanized: čerkeska, IPA: [tɕɪrˈkʲeskə]; Ukrainian: черкеска, romanized: čerkeska, IPA: [tʃerˈkɛskɐ]) (/ˈtʃɒkə, tʃoʊˈxɑː/) is a woolen coat with a high neck. It is part of the traditional male attire for various peoples of the Caucasus, as well as Terek and Kuban Cossacks of the former Russian Empire, who subsequently adopted it.

== Etymology ==
Although the exact origin of chokha as a garment is unclear, the terminology used to describe it has varied. According to the Dehkhoda Dictionary the word chokha is of Turkic origin, while others claim an Iranian root, meaning 'outfit made of textile'. The Chokha became known amongst Russians as the cherkeska due to its association with Circassians, who are thought to be the first people Russians saw to wear the garment. The Russians subsequently applied this term to a variety of similar garments worn by all peoples of the Caucasus. However, in Circassian languages themselves, this term was not adopted and the outfit is known as shwakh-tsia which means 'covers the horseman', or simply tsey, meaning 'from fabric'.

== Revival ==
The chokha was in wide use among the inhabitants of the Caucasus from the 8th century until the Soviet era in the early 20th century. Nowadays, the chokha is no longer in everyday use, but continues to still be worn for ceremonial and festive occasions. For many, it is a symbol of a fight for freedom. In Georgia it is used as a symbol of national pride, and is frequently worn by Georgian men at weddings and official functions. Former Georgian president Mikheil Saakashvili ordered high-ranking Georgian officials working abroad to present themselves in national costumes, including the chokha, at official meetings. On June 9, 2020, Georgia's National Agency for Cultural Heritage Preservation recognized chokha-wearing tradition as a part of the intangible cultural heritage of Georgia.

== Types ==
Chokha types and designs vary by region and by culture but there are two types of chokhas worn most commonly in Caucasus: general and weighted. The common features are that the collars of both chokhas are cut open and the skirt of the coats are usually either corrugated or pleated. Chokha is usually made of broadcloth or shawl but some chokhas are made of thinner textiles for festive occasions. It was also common for chokhas to be worn without the bullet pockets or gazyrs. An arkhalig would also be worn under chokha. The style, decorations and patterns on chokha varies among ethnicities.

There were also chukha types that included Persian elements such as the folding sleeves, completely unsewn from the armpit to the elbow, and sleeves that are cut in half from top which were worn for casual use. Those persianate style chukhas were predominantly worn among the inhabitants of South Caucasus, especially among Azerbaijanis, Eastern Armenians, inhabitants of southern Dagestan, as well as among the Persians. In some artworks, Georgians are also depicted wearing it. The chukhas with the folding sleeves were the main uniform and clothing attire in the army of the Caucasian khanates. Later, it was in wide use in the Caucasian Convoy of the Imperial army and became a uniform of the chief officers of Muslim (Azerbaijani) and Lezgin Squadron. Along with the coat, a tall Qajar era fur hat was worn.

=== General type ===
This is the most widely used type of chokha in the Caucasus. From the colors, the length and the general design of the chokha, it was possible to know a person's age, profession, and even class. The general cherkeska were sewn not only from gray and black fabric, but also from red, blue, green, golden yellow, purple and brown. The lining of the sleeve of the general chokha is made of silk fabric, the sleeves often have loops and buttons made of string. Chokhas with very long skirts were popular among the nobility. It is cut at the waist with gathers and folds, girded with a black leather belt decorated with silver pieces, the belt buckle served as a chair for carving fire. The outfit was a clothing for combat, it was not supposed to hinder movement, so the sleeves were wide and short, sometimes with rows of buttons down the openings, and hand flaps. Only the old people wore the sleeves long to warm the hands. As mentioned previously, later on cases were added to place cartridges, the cases made it possible to load a flint or match gun at full gallop. Sometimes the cases were located almost under the armpits. An obligatory item of both men's and women's clothing was long tight pants - an element of clothing that was present among the steppe peoples, which was necessary for frequent horseback riding and in harsh climatic conditions. The general outfit almost always includes a dagger called khinjal, a beshmet worn under the chokha, gazyrs (bullet/charge holders), and a bashlyk (a hood, separate from the robe) or a papakha (a tall fur hat).

=== Weighted type ===
Unlike the general chokha, which was typically worn for battle, the main attribute of the weighted chokha is its small bullet-pockets or cartridge holders on both sides of the chest, which over time turned into having a purely decorative significance. Gazyrs for this chokha were made of wood, and in the upper, above-pocket part they had small hoods out of gold or silver with niello or gilt. Sometimes there were golden or silver chains going up front the gazyrs where they were connected with a rosette. It was customary for the weighted chokha to have a set of about eight cartridge holders on each breast.

=== Georgians ===
Among Georgians, three types of chokhas are primarily used: the Kartl-Kakheti chokha (Kartli and Kakheti are eastern Georgian provinces), the Khevsur chokha (mainly in the Mtskheta-Mtianeti province of Georgia), and the Adjarian chokha (mainly found in western Georgian provinces such as Adjara and Guria, previously also in Lazona). In Georgia, the color black for chokha was reserved to the "Orden of Chokhosani" who represented the elite society of the citizens: great generals, war heroes, famous poets, and the people who had done some big service to the country. Special decorations were also used to denote their status.

==== Kartli-Kakheti chokha ====
The Kartli-Kakheti version shares similarities with the general Caucasian chokha. In most cases, different decorations fill the bullet spaces. The Kartli-Kakheti chokha is longer than the Khevsur chokha and has triangle-like shapes on the chest, exposing the inner cloth called beshmet. It tends to have gazyrs (locally called masri) on both sides of the chest-spaces. The skirt usually has slits on the sides. People wear them without belts. The Kartli-Kakheti chokha has long sleeves and is usually black, dark red or blue.

This is the most popular chokha used in Georgia, often seen in official meeting and musical performance.

==== Khevsurian chokha ====
The Khevsur chokha was worn in the Khevsureti province of Georgia in the Greater Caucasus mountains. The Khevsur chokha is considered to be the closest to the medieval version of the chokha as it shares similarities in design with the aforementioned caftan found in Moschevaya Balka. It is mostly short, with trapezoid shapes. The front side of the chokha has rich decorations and slits on the sides, which extend to the waist. The Khevsur chokha has rich decorations made up of crosses and icons.

==== Adjarian chokha ====
The Adjarian chokha is worn in Adjara, Guria regions of Georgia and was worn in historical Lazeti(modern day Turkey), though, the outfit is more similar to the clothing worn by Pontic Greeks. Adjaran national men's costume consists of a shirt (perangi) and trousers cut out in a specific way (dzigva) and sewn from wool fabric or sateen of black colour. Because trousers are folded, wide on top and narrowed down, they were comfortable and were easy to wear in action. The outer garment was zubuni that was tucked into the trousers. Zubunis were winter clothing, warmed with cotton lining and sleeveless vests. The most expensive and visible part is chokha which was tied around with special broad belt with laces or leather belt. Kabalakhi (or bashlyk) is a winter headwear made of thin wool. And, of course, outfit would not be complete without a dagger in sheath, a rifle and bandolier or gazyr. As footwear they used colorful wool knitted socks, pachula (soft leather shoes) and boots tied with belts.

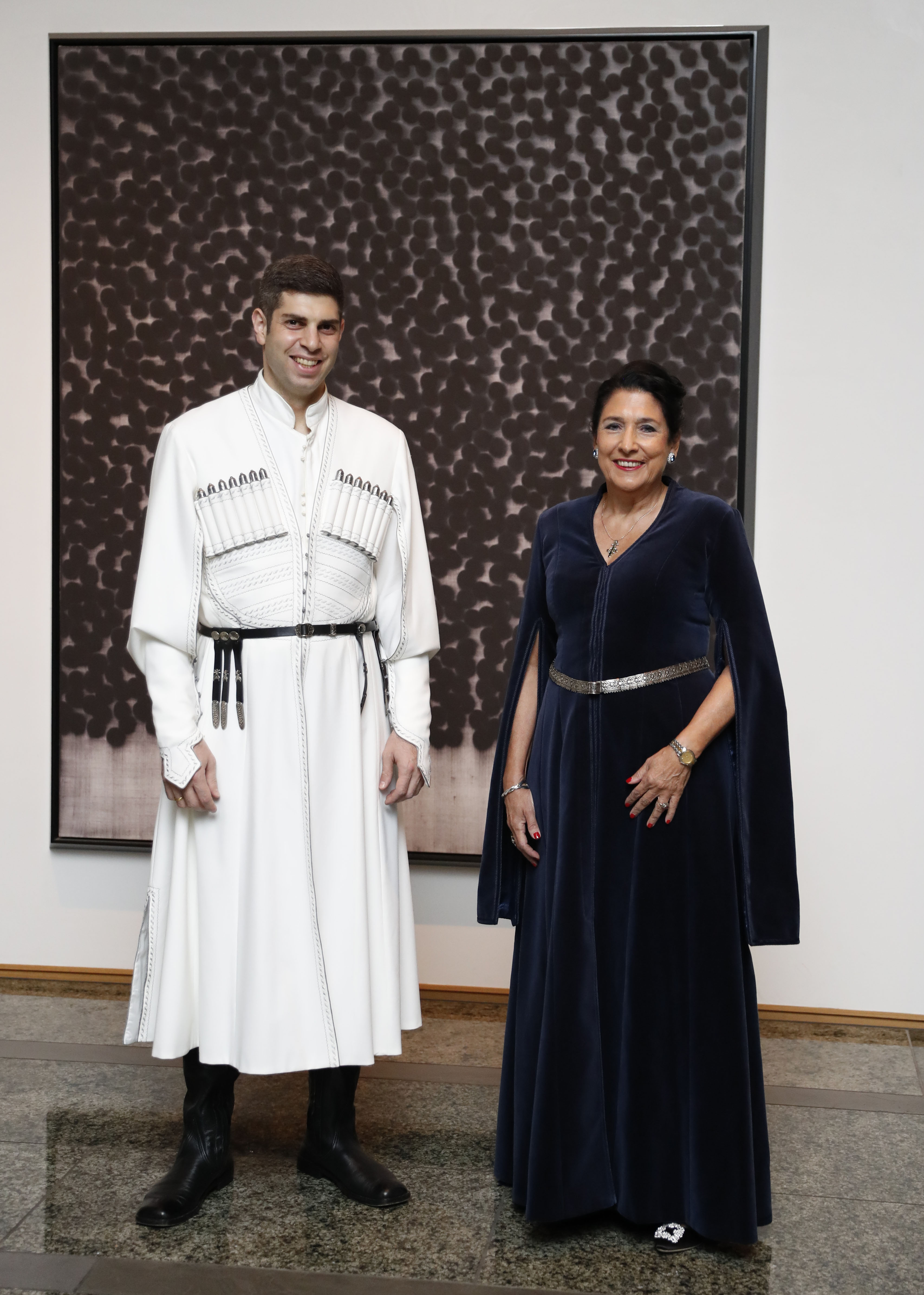
Georgian ambassador to Japan dressed in Chokha (left), standing alongside President Salome Zurabishvili

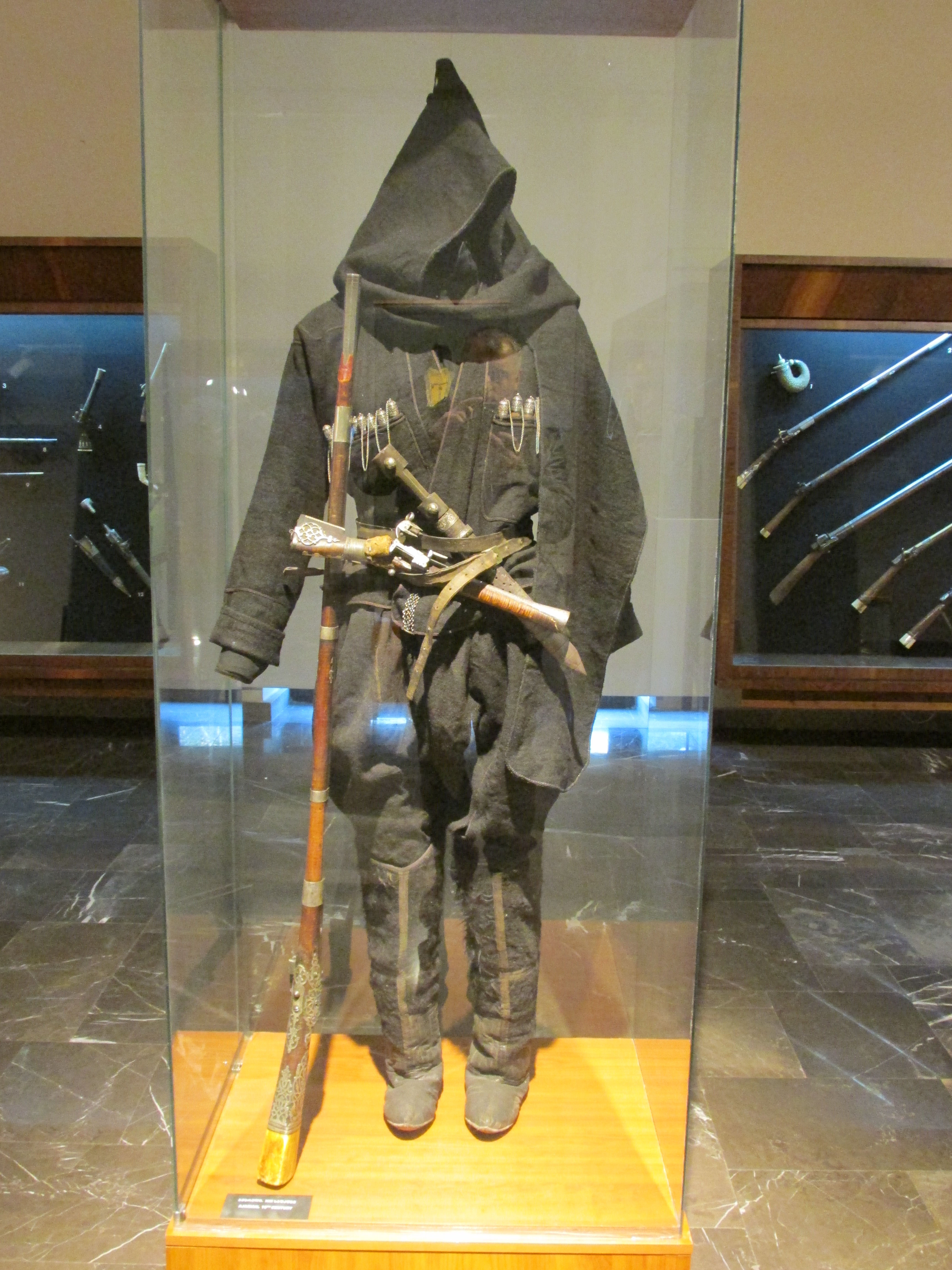
Adjarian chokha.

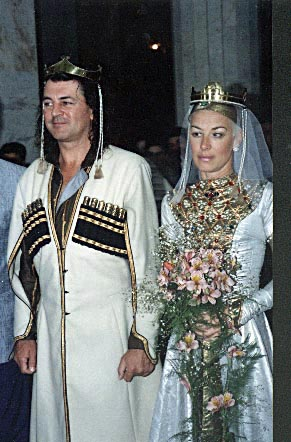
English hard rock singer Ian Gillan wearing a Georgian chokha alongside his wife Bron Gillan during their visit to Tbilisi, 1990

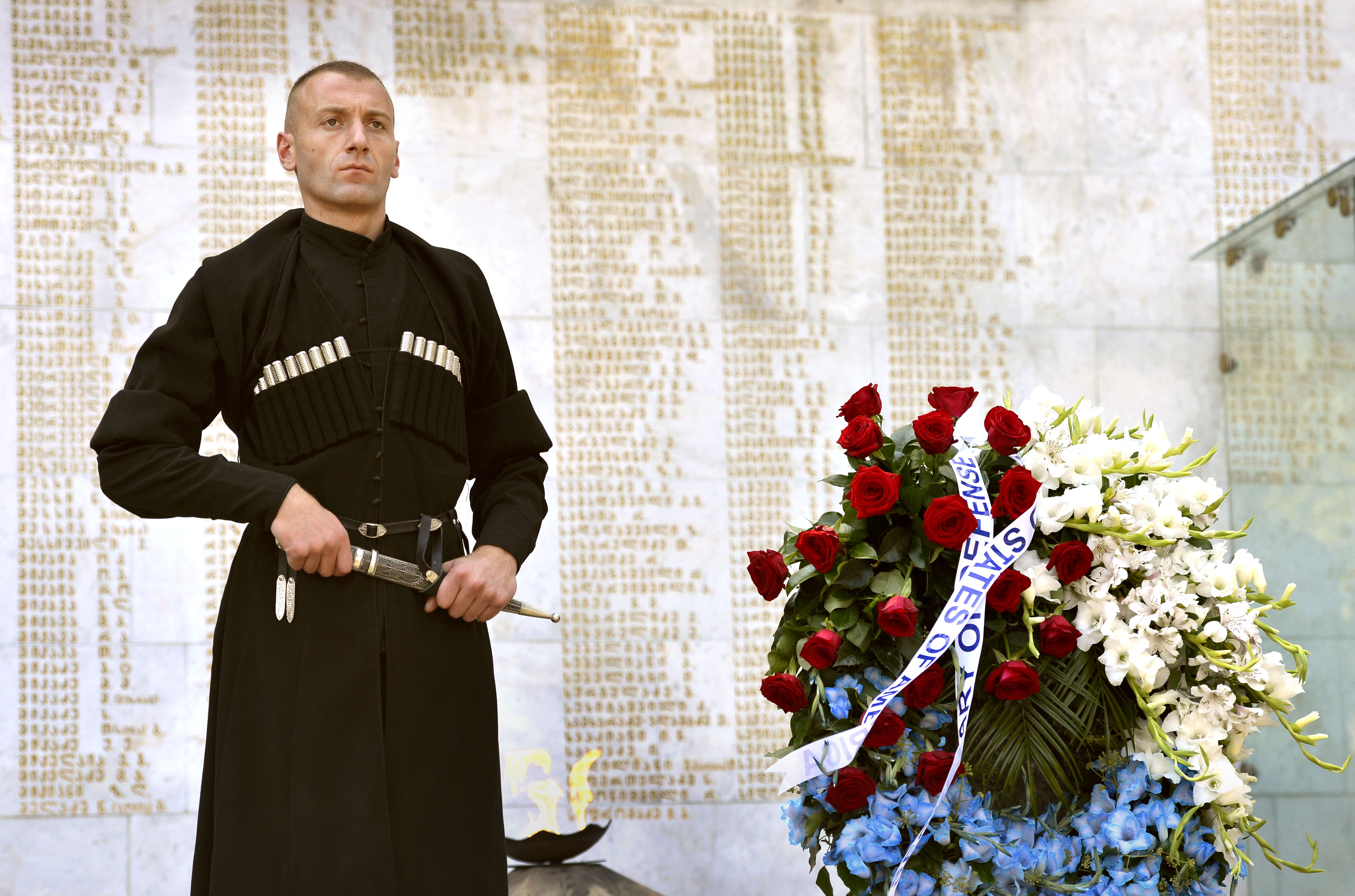
Georgian soldier in chokha standing his post at a memorial at Heroes Square, Tbilisi

=== Armenians ===
In Eastern Armenia, men's attire included a cotton shirt, a long woolen chukha, form of the Caucasian cherkeska, and a sheepskin or lambskin fur hat.

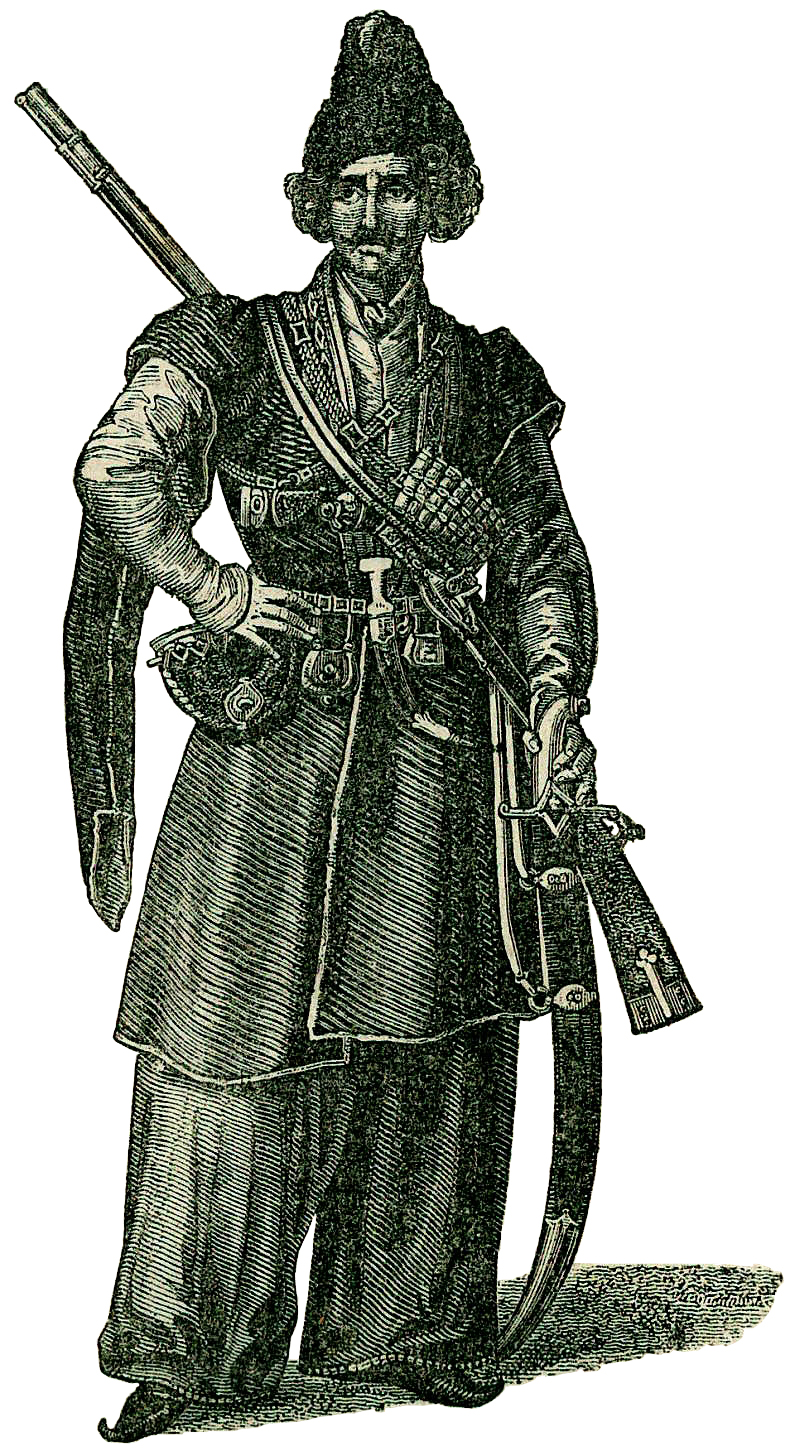
Armenian warrior ( F. A. Brockhaus, 1837)

=== North Caucasians ===
Evgenia Nikolaevna Studenetskaya, a well-known scholar and museum figure who worked for more than 50 years at the State Museum of Ethnography (now the Russian Museum of Ethnography), was one of the best experts on the customs of the peoples of the Caucasus, as well as the costume of the peoples of the North Caucasus. In 1989, she published the book "Clothes of the peoples of the North Caucasus of the XVIII-XX centuries" (Russian: "Одежда народов Северного Кавказа. XVIII—XX вв."). Generally, the North Caucasian groups wore a very similar style of the general cherkeska. The only way one could tell to which group the coat belonged to is by inspecting the textile it was made of, the decorations, and the number bullet cases sown on the cherkeska.

According to her book, in Circassian and Abkhazian societies the cherkeska was worn among the royals, the knights, and of upper class. Different colors of clothing for males were strictly used to distinguish between different social classes, for example white is usually worn by princes, red by nobles, gray, brown, and black by peasants (blue, green and the other colors were rarely worn). Until 1785, Circassia resembled the medieval states of Western Europe due to their feudal systems, however, the spread of Islam in those territories started to diminish the system. Because of the feudalist nature of their society Circassian knightly culture was developed. They made up the troops of the Circassian principalities, almost identical in structure, form, and in other parameters to the European concept of "knightly army". The cherkeska was in wide use among the Circassian cavalry and was worn together with weaponry and armor. It was also common among inhabitants of Northwestern Caucasus to wear cherkeskas with no open cut on the chest. The number of pockets or cases for gazyrs can vary from 4-5 up to 18 on each side of the chest. The numbers of gazyrs is special as its also an indicator of status and ranking among the Circassians especially among the noble warriors.

Weapons that are frequently worn with the Circassian attire is a dagger called kama (Adyghe: Къамэ or Сэ) or kinzhal (when transliterating Russian: кинжал) and a sword called shashka (Adyghe: Сэшхо, Səs̨xue - a big knife). It is a special kind of sabre; a very sharp, single-edged, single-handed, and guardless sword. Although the sword is used by most of Russian and Ukrainian Cossacks, the typically Adyghean form of the sabre is longer than the Cossack type.

The cherkeskas Ossetians wore had a slightly different characteristics. In art, Ossetians are depicted in a short cherkeska without a cutout on the chest, its sides are pulled together by three pairs of strings. Ossetians also have other caftans of similar design to the general cherkeska such karts, a winter sheepskin coat, and a lighter unlined linen caftan with frogging called the kurta, both are words of Iranian origin. Ossetians and Circassians generally wore their coats in similar fashion. The coats were most of the time made of black or gray cloth, with split sleeves. Sometimes the sleeves have a slit on the inside from the armpit and below the elbow, coats with sleeves shortened to the elbow were also commonly used. Ossetians wore gazyrs cases made from leather which held cartridges from 7 to 10 compartments.

Materials among the Nakh peoples are poorer. There are various depictions by travellers of Ingush men in a cherkeska with a standing collar, the coat resembles the type worn among the Northwestern Caucasians. In the album published in Paris in 1813, Chechens are depicted in short, knee-length coats with narrow sleeves. Alexander Beggrov depicts a Chechen in a short fur coat with a separate gas cap hanging on a belt. In D.A. Milyutin's works, a Chechen is depicted in a short, but wide-open coat with a narrow sleeves.

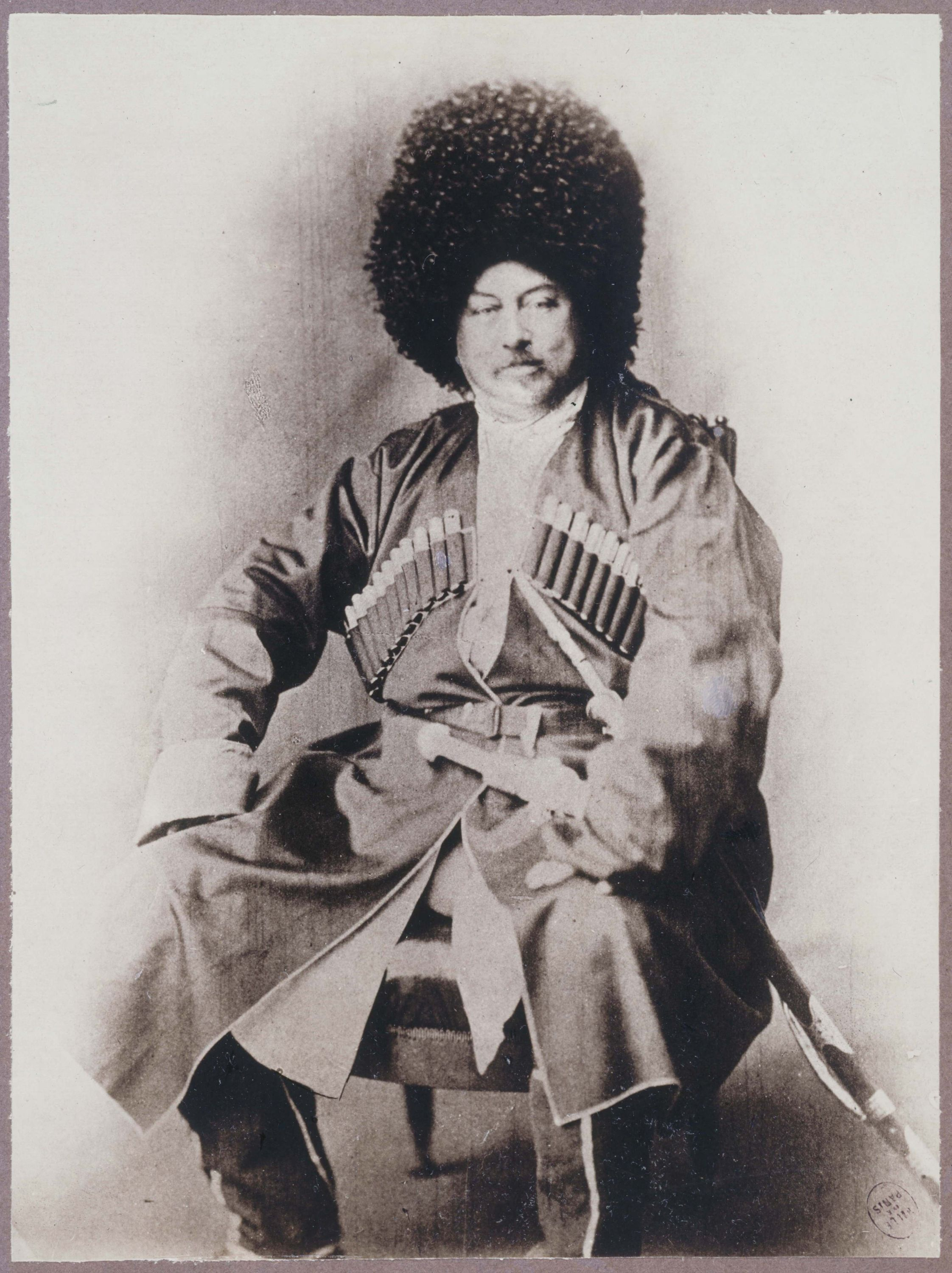
Alexandre Dumas in a chokha and papakha during a trip to the Caucasus, c. 1850s

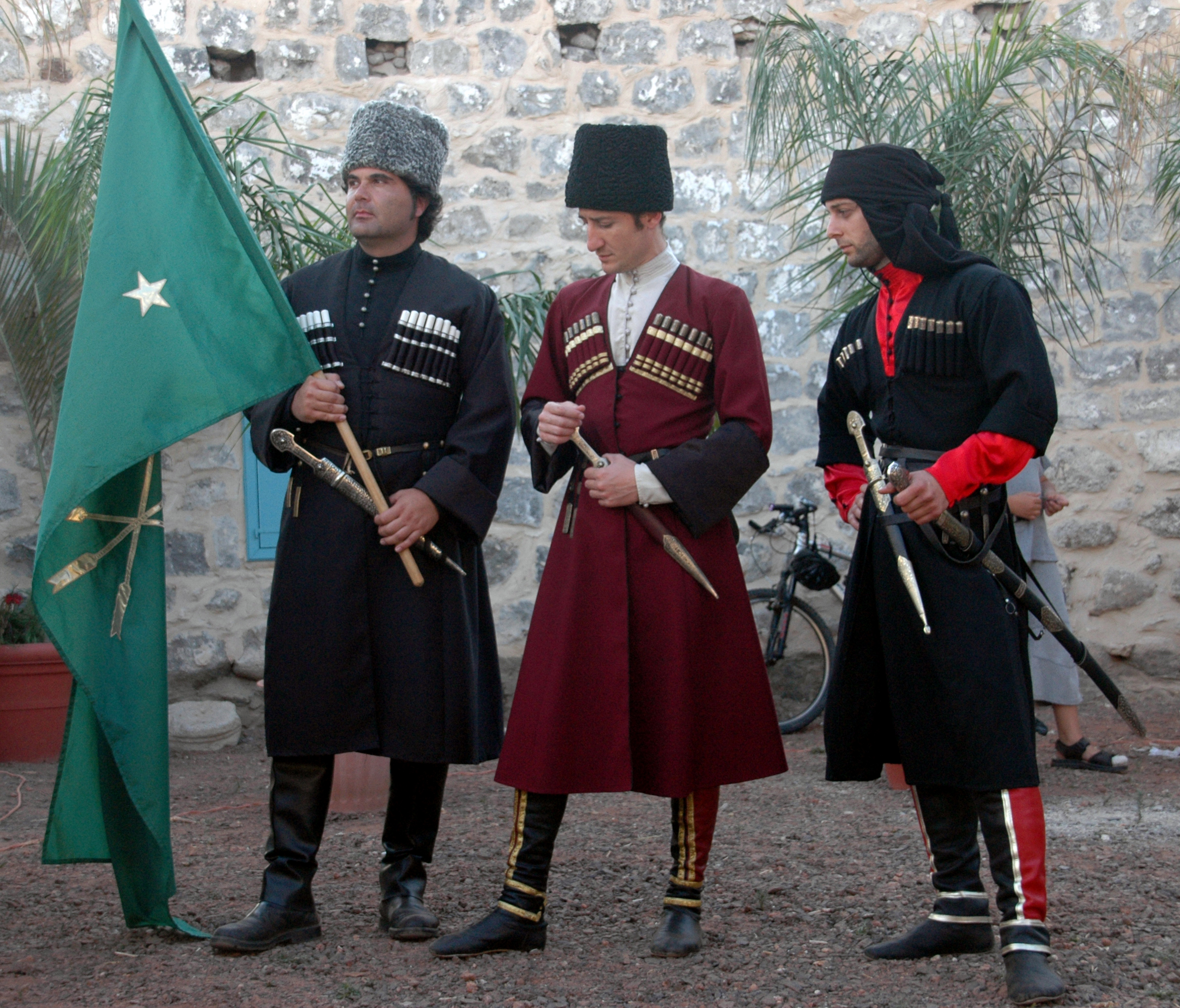
Circassians in chokha.

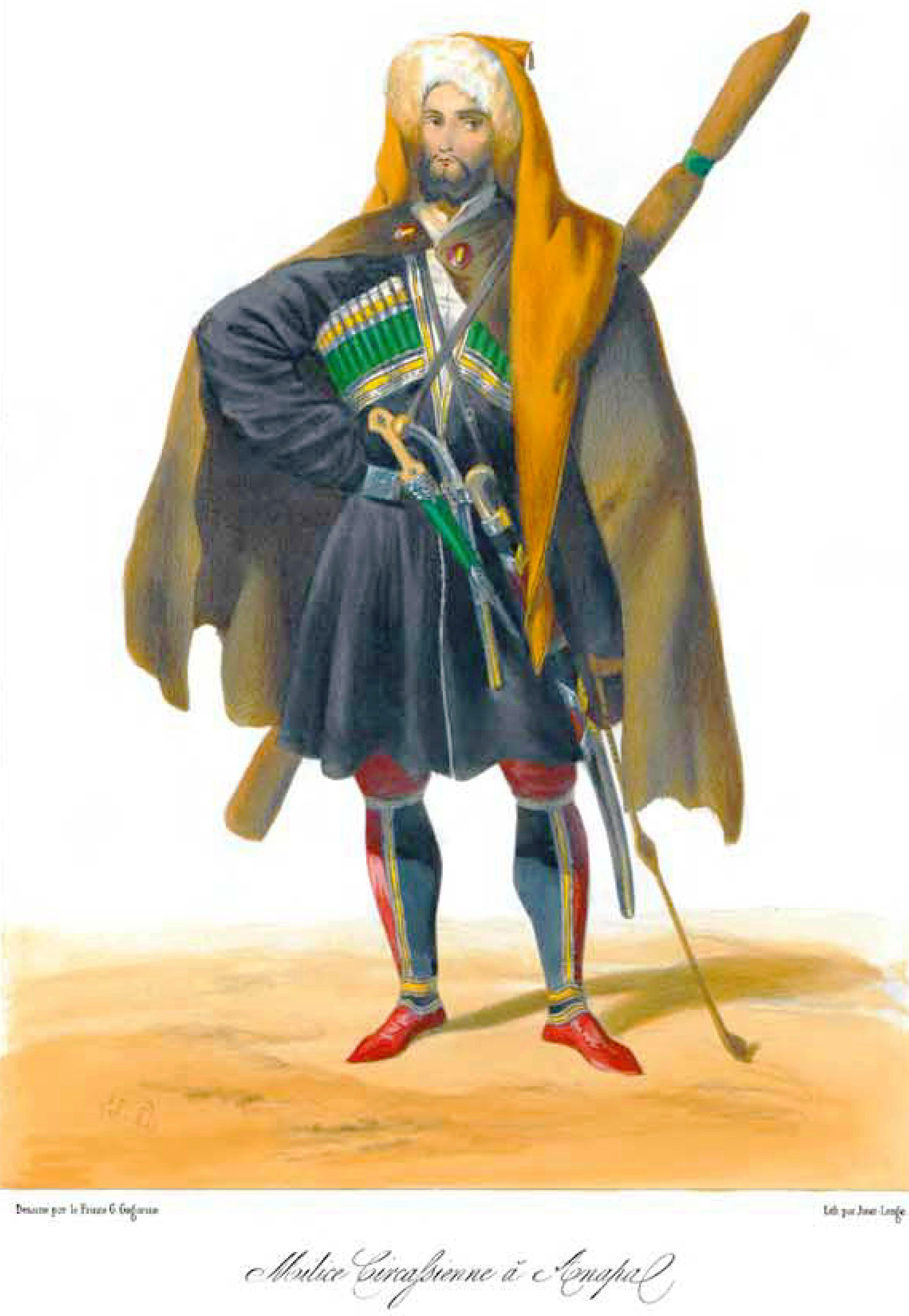
Circassian from Anapa. (artist - Gagarin GG)

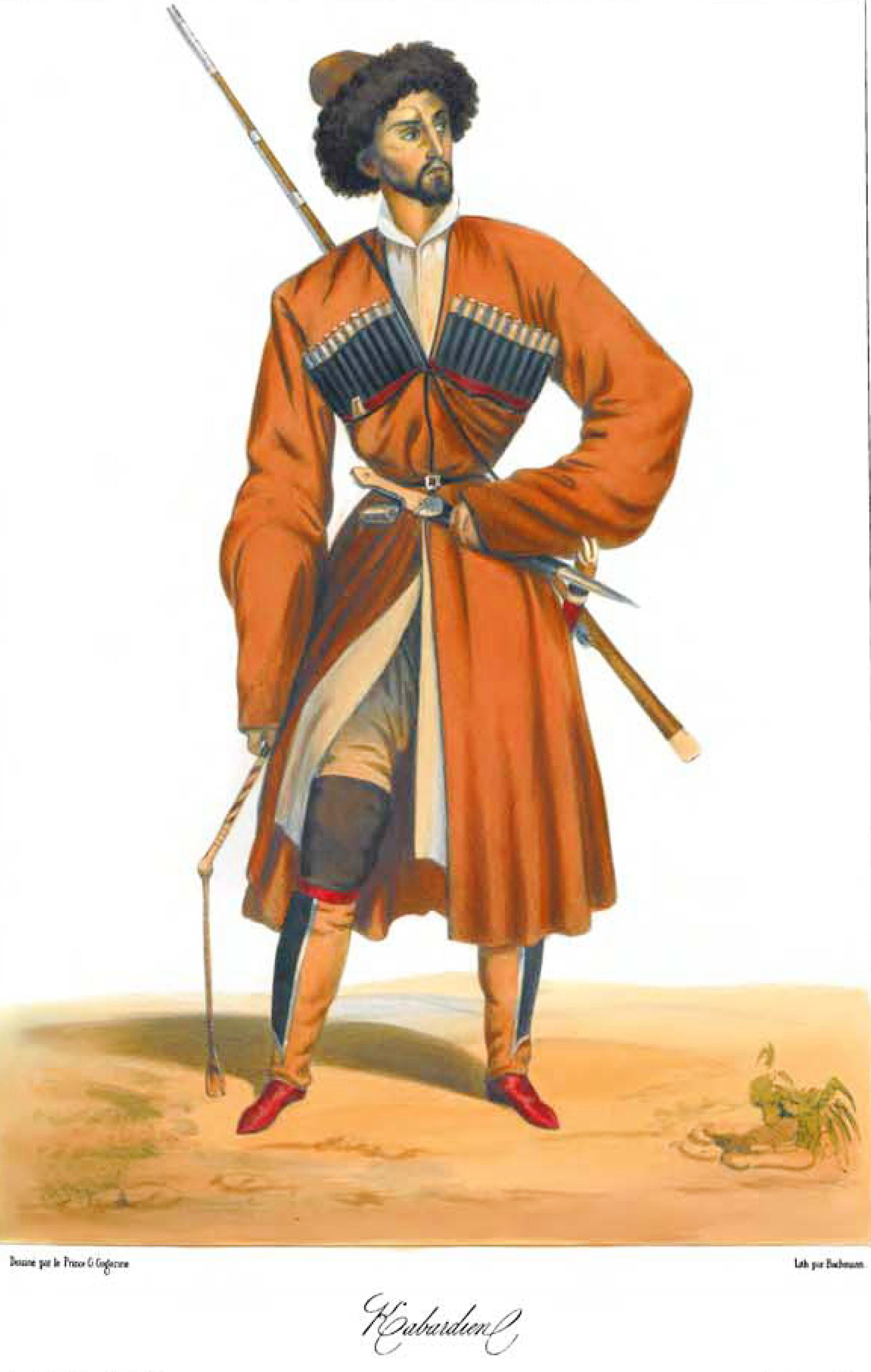
Kabardian. (artist - Gagarin GG)

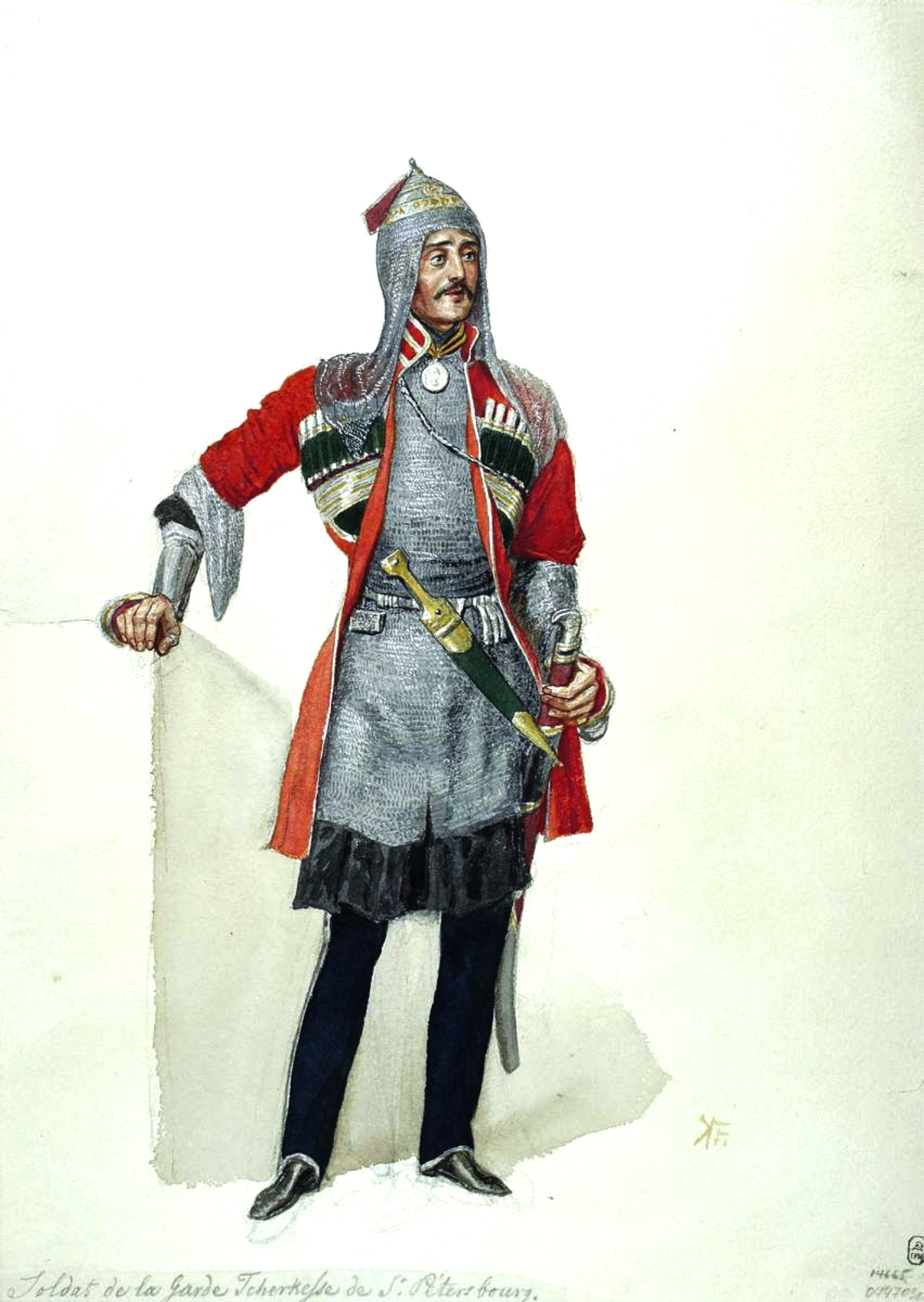
Circassian guard of St. Petersburg, (artist - Gagarin GG)

=== Azerbaijanis ===
Azerbaijanis wore the chukha with or without the gazyrs. The chukha with sewn bullet pockets was known as hazırdaşlı (and hazırdaşsız without the sewn bullet pockets). The caftan and the bullet cases are decorated with various golden or silver laces and other fabrics, specific decorations and patterns are usually added on their costumes that makes it differ from the other styles. The color of the chukha mattered to Azerbaijanis as well. The colors that were used most often were blue, green, white, brown, and black. The colors white and blue were used for the inside of the coat and as a layer indicator. In Azerbaijani society, the chukha was worn among the peasants as well as the upper class, while in other parts of the Caucasus it was worn to attribute to upper class and the aristocracy as a remnant of Khazar traditions, it had more of a symbol of boasting than practicality. Different materials and decorations were used on chukhas and arkhaligs to determine social class and age. Some chukas were not worn for battles and did not have gazyrs, Azerbaijanis wore those for performing their folk music such as mugham. Azerbaijani men usually wore the chukha and the arkhalig in the same fashion Turkmens, Volga Tatars and the Crimean Tatars wore their caftans. Aside from the general and weighted chukha, the other types that were in wide use among Azerbaijanis were the düzyaxa, oymayaxa, and the atmaqol chukhas.

One of the most popular types of chukhas used among Azerbaijanis was the atmaqol chukha, which is a style of chukha worn for battles. The arms of atmaqol were long and the entirety of the sleeves were cut and completely detached. The long sleeves could be hung behind the shoulder. Aside from the aesthetic, the sleeves were used to deceive the enemy during battle and also to keep the hands warm. The atmaqol chukha is considered to be a national pride of the Azerbaijani people and is an important part of the male traditional attire along with the arkhalig.

Düzyaxa and oymayaxa differed from general chukha when it came to the shape of the arm. The lining of the arm with a swollen or rounded tip was made of silk. These sleeves often had loops and buttons made of string. Oymayakha was similar to düzyaxa as neither required bullet pockets; however, the two types differed in the design of the collar: oymayaxa translates as 'plain collar', while oymayaxa means 'carved collar'. Oymayaxa was popular in Nakhchivan. The collar of the coat was heavily decorated, and the design reflected the fashion of the Qajar era. Other types of chukhas worn by Azerbaijanis that were recorded are the kəmərçin, büzməli, taxtalı, qolçaqlı, döşüaçıq, and the doqquztaxta.

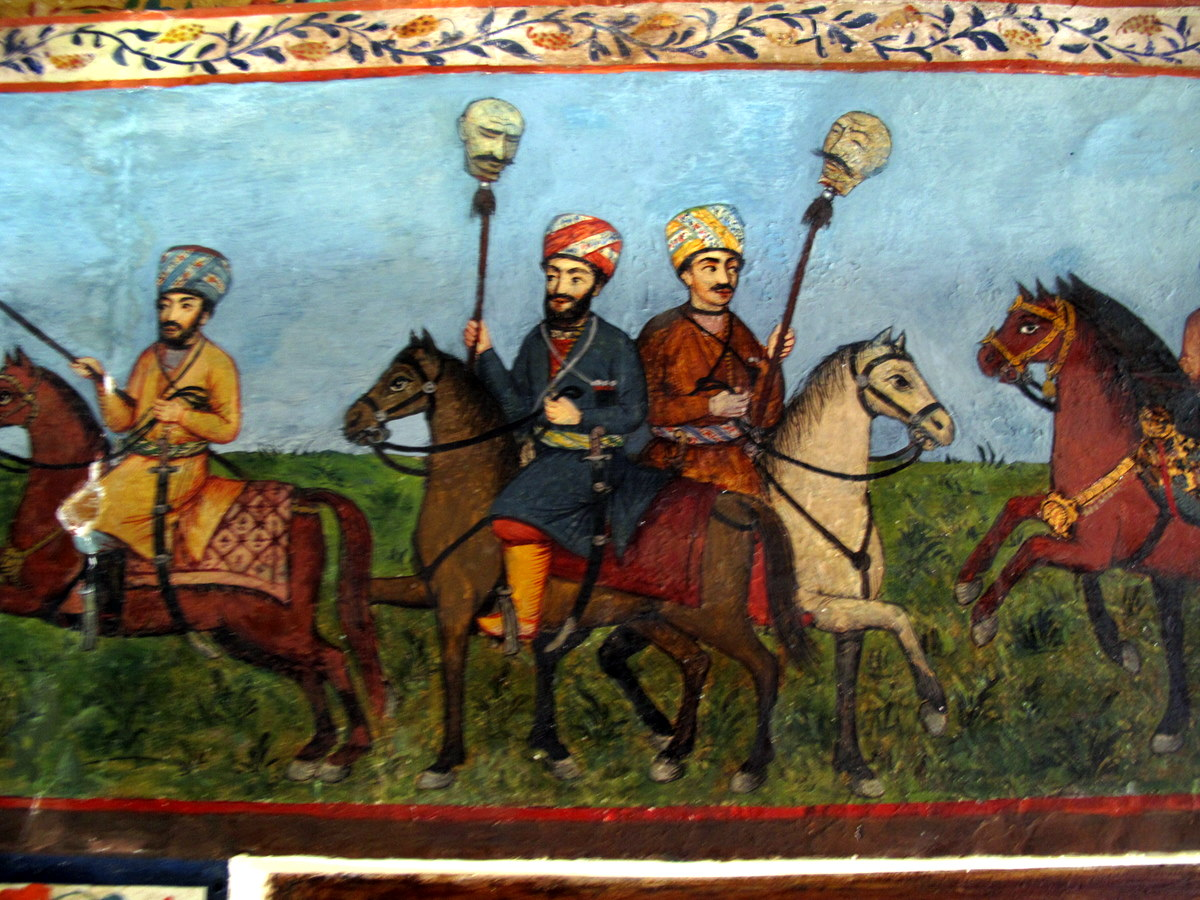
Miniature painting of men wearing chukha with removable gazyrs, Palace of Shaki Khans, 1797.

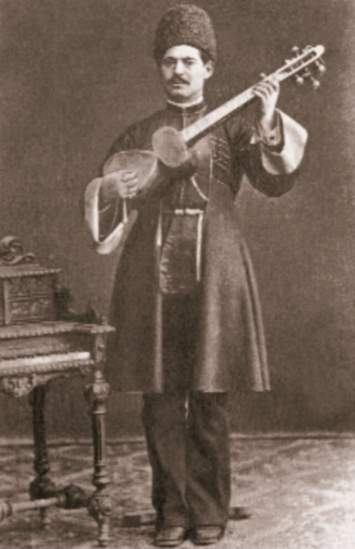
Mirza Sadig, a popular Azerbaijani musician, wearing a chukha and playing the tar.

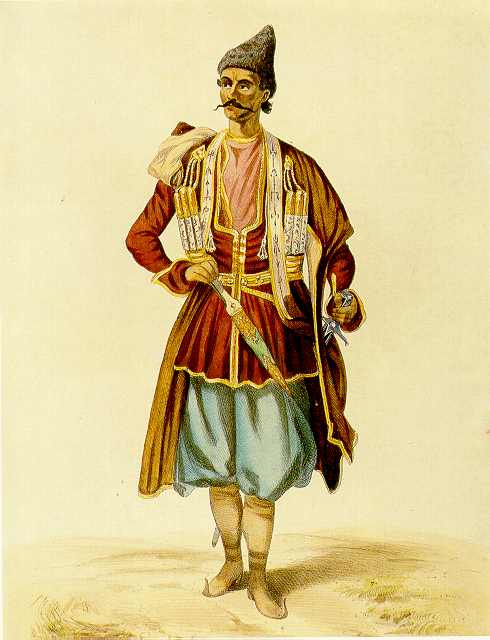
A Tatar Bek (Note: In the original, the drawing is called "Bek-Tatar from Karabakh" (French: Beck Tatare du Karabakhe). It is known that in the 19th century when Russian travelers referred to Azerbaijanis as "Tatars".) from Karabakh.

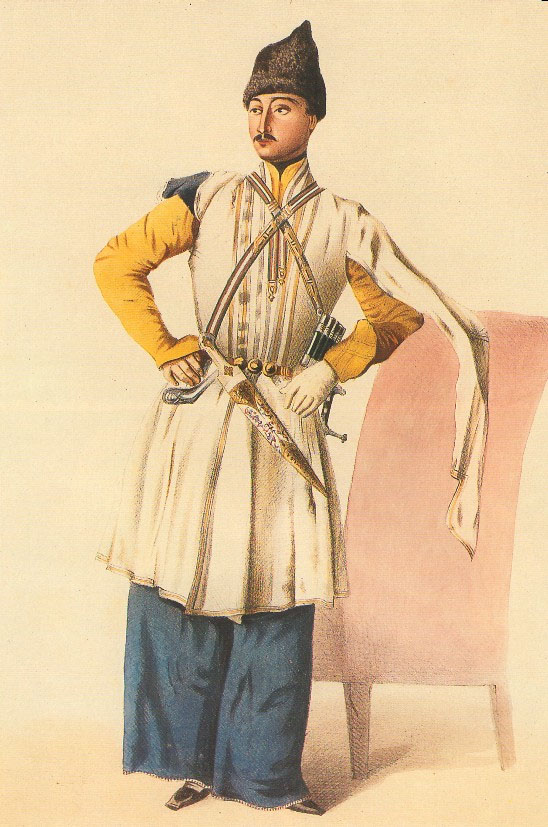
Young Tatar Bek wearing an atmaqol chukha.

=== Cossacks ===
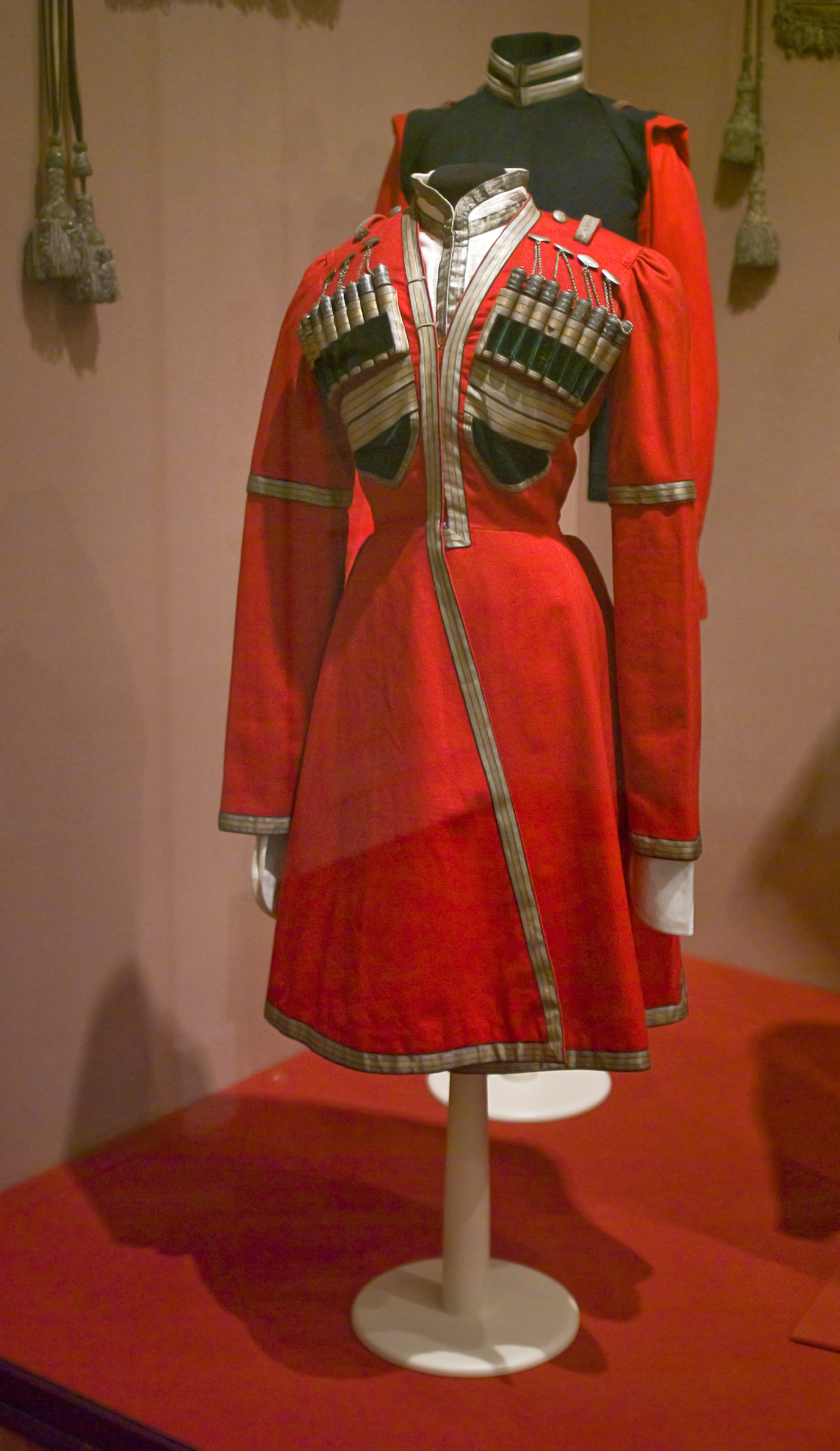
A Cossack cherkeska.

Cherkeska was constantly worn by Terek and Kuban Cossacks and the dress code was identical to the one worn by Caucasians. The main color worn in the army was in black, gray, dark blue, white, and brown; red was only worn for important ceremonies. Although the color of the daily cherkeska was up to the individual's choice, by the time of the Great War each Cossack had to wear a gray cherkeska and black beshmet as a uniform. Some cossacks variated their cherkeskas and beshmets with different kinds of halons and cartridges, sewed initials or namesakes and decorated it with various laces, but that was considered unprofessional.

The length of the coat was regulated in the army but was not strongly enforced until later. Before the war of 1914–1918, its length decreased significantly and reached almost a knee. This was partly due to the convenience of movement and landing on a horse, and partly for the sake of aesthetics. But the concept of aesthetics is conditional and in the late 19th century the cherkeska was worn long, reaching many almost heels. On the cutout and at the bottom it is sheathed with a shoelace, black or in the color of the material from which it is sewn. It is fastened on internal hooks or loops tied from the lace with which it is sheathed. Cossacks called such fasteners "gudzyki". In winter, some Cossacks wore cherkeskas with fur called "Bekirks" or "kurks".
