= Bandolier =

Pocketed belt worn to hold either individual bullets, or belts of ammunition

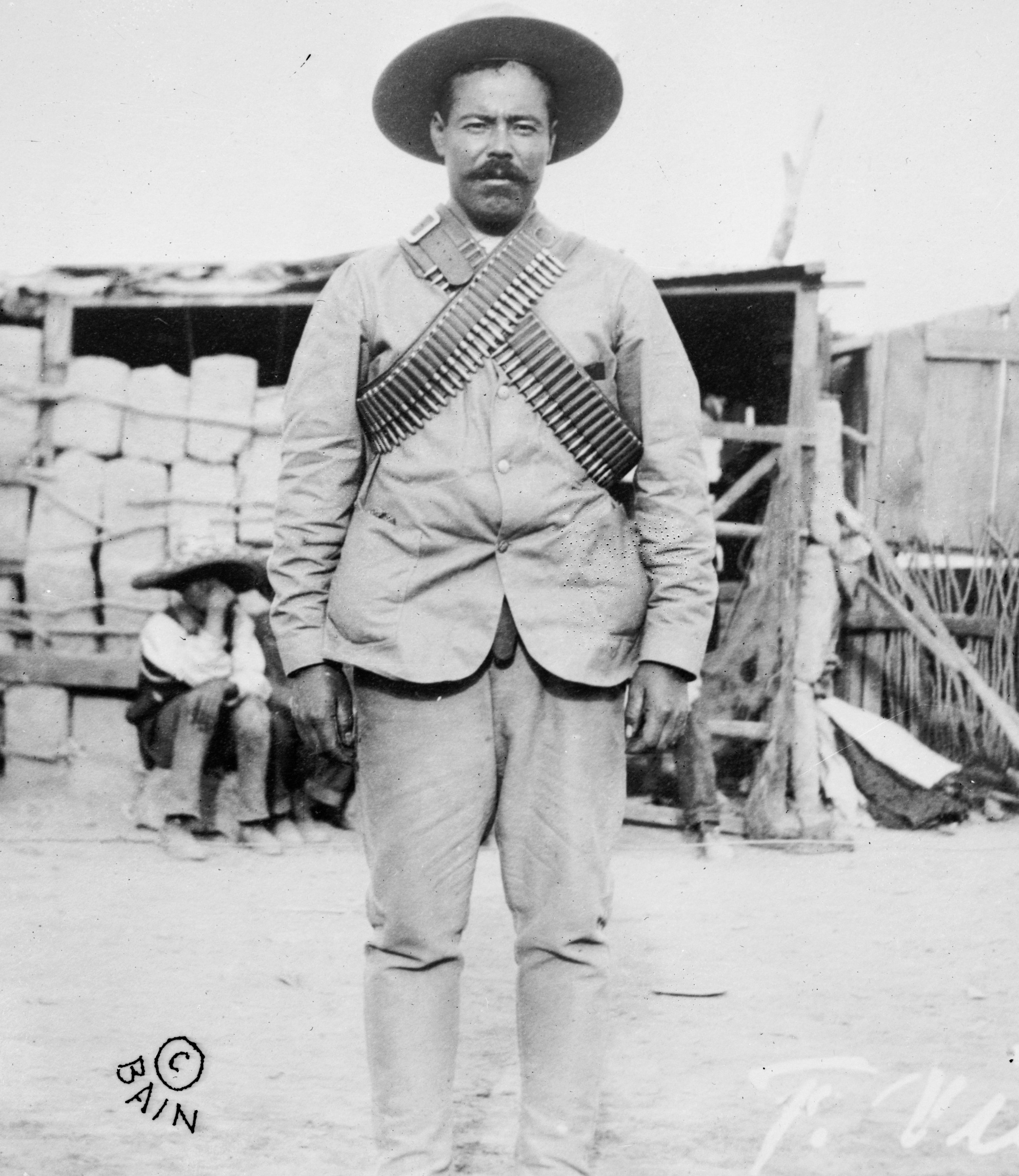
Mexican revolutionary general Pancho Villa wearing two bandoliers

A bandolier or bandoleer, sometimes shortened to bando, is a pocketed belt for holding multiple individual cartridges, belts of ammunition, or grenades. It is usually slung sash-style over the shoulder and chest, with the ammunition pockets across the midriff and chest. Though functionally similar, it is distinct from a chest rig designed to hold magazines.

== History ==
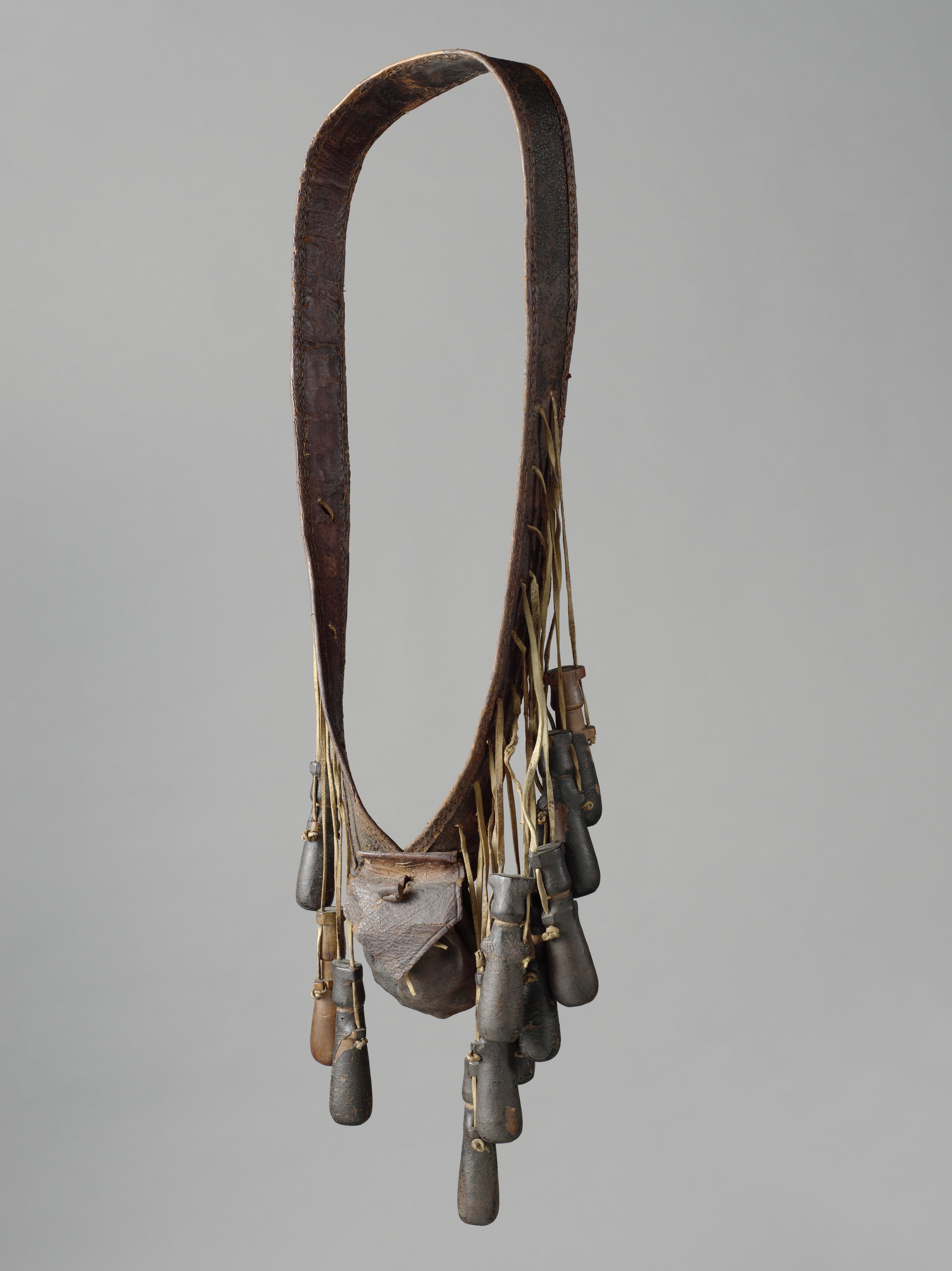
A complete bandolier of the 17th century

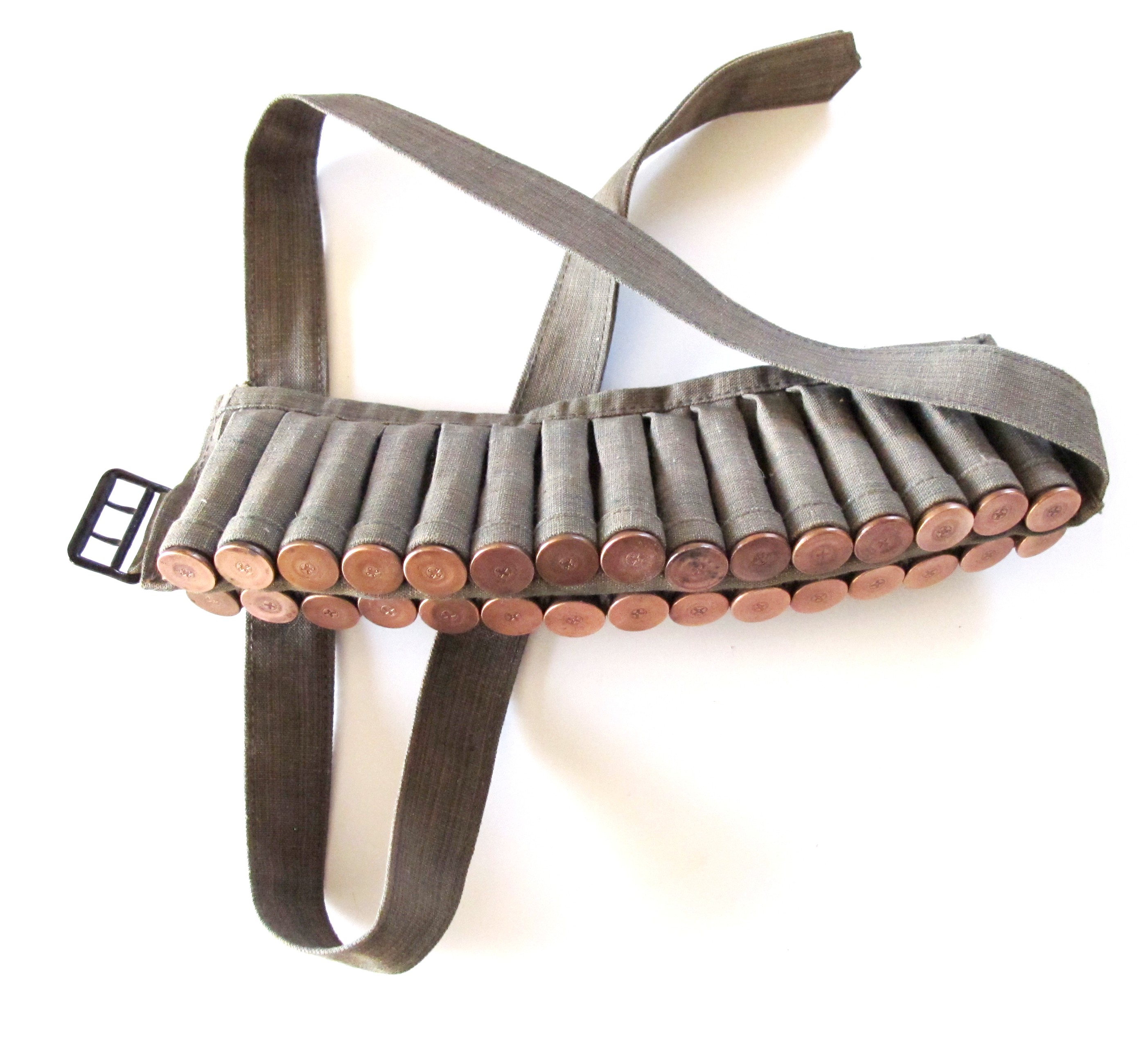
A .41 Swiss intermediate cartridge bandolier

By the late 15th century, the earliest viable handheld firearms in Europe were the arquebus fitted with a matchlock mechanism. The user kept his shot in a leather pouch and his powder in a flask with a volumetric spout. The spout was calibrated to deliver the proper charge for the user's arquebus. With the advent of the heavy arquebus (later known as a musket) in the early 16th century, a spout large enough to measure the required powder was impractical. Furthermore, trying to double or triple charge from a flask was time consuming and could create a “missed” charge. A bandolier from whence would hang several little flasks each filled with a dedicated premeasured charge was the solution to this problem. Since these were loaded prior to going into battle, the musketeer could take the time to accurately measure each charge.

The bandolier was fitted with small wooden bottles called charges. The charges were recommended to be turned from a single piece of wood; a two-piece design (tube with a bottom) could come apart and metal charges make too much noise. The number of charges was determined from the size of the musket, that is, the weight of the ball it fired. Each musketeer was issued a pound of lead from which they would cast their ammunition. For instance, if they had a 1 1/3 ounce (583.1 gr (37.78 g)) musket ball, a pound of lead would provide them with 12 balls, hence, 12 charges. A “two-ouncer” would have eight charges. Throughout Europe in the 16th and 17th centuries, the number of charges varied between 8 and 16. Additionally, the bandolier would be fitted with a bullet pouch and a priming flask. It might also carry an oil flask for the lock mechanism, a match keeper, or other accessories.

The evolution of a sparking type lock mechanism, such as the flintlock, paved the way for the development of paper cartridge containing a premeasured powder charge and a lead ball wrapped in paper. The bandolier then became a shoulder strap fitted to a bag or satchel wherein the cartridges could be carried. Eventually, any bag worn in the same style may also be described as a bandolier bag or possibles bag; similarly, pocketed belts holding ammunition worn around the waist may also be called bandoliers.

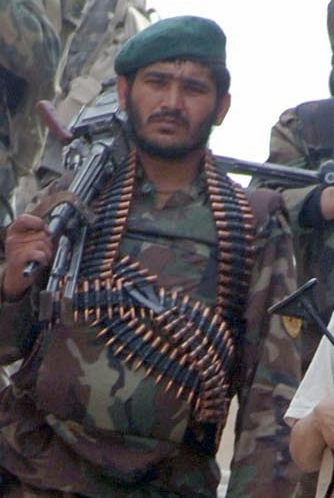
Modern Afghan National Army soldier wearing a belt of ammunition

A somewhat different form of bandolier came into use in the late 19th century that held modern metallic cartridges and hand grenades. Bandoliers are now less common due to the use of detachable magazines and belt-fed firearms, though extra ammunition belts are often carried around the body like a bandolier. They are, however, still often used with shotguns, hand grenades, and grenade launchers.

Shotgun shells can easily be stored in traditionally designed bandoliers. In fact, some aftermarket shotgun slings are designed in a fashion similar to traditional bandoliers, albeit with a far more limited capacity.

In World War I and World War II, bandoliers were issued primarily to riflemen. They were made of cloth, stitched into pockets which held clips of rifle ammunition. In civilian use, bandoliers are often worn by hunters and recreational shooters using shotguns.

The Chetniks of World War II made heavy use of bandoliers, often carrying two over the shoulder and two around the hip, using the latter as a holster for revolvers and daggers.

Another modern use of a bandolier is for the automatic rifleman of a military fireteam. Since a squad automatic weapon is often belt-fed, an automatic rifleman will carry an extra belt on his person; either in a separate compartment or slung over the chest in bandolier fashion. The bandolier was used to keep ammunition off a soldier's hips, as carrying too much weight on the hips can constrain movement and cause difficulty in retrieving the ammunition.

== See also ==
- Baldric
- Cartridge box
- Gazyr
- Sam Browne belt
- Shoulder belt (military)
