= Gazyr =

Device that holds rifle cartridges

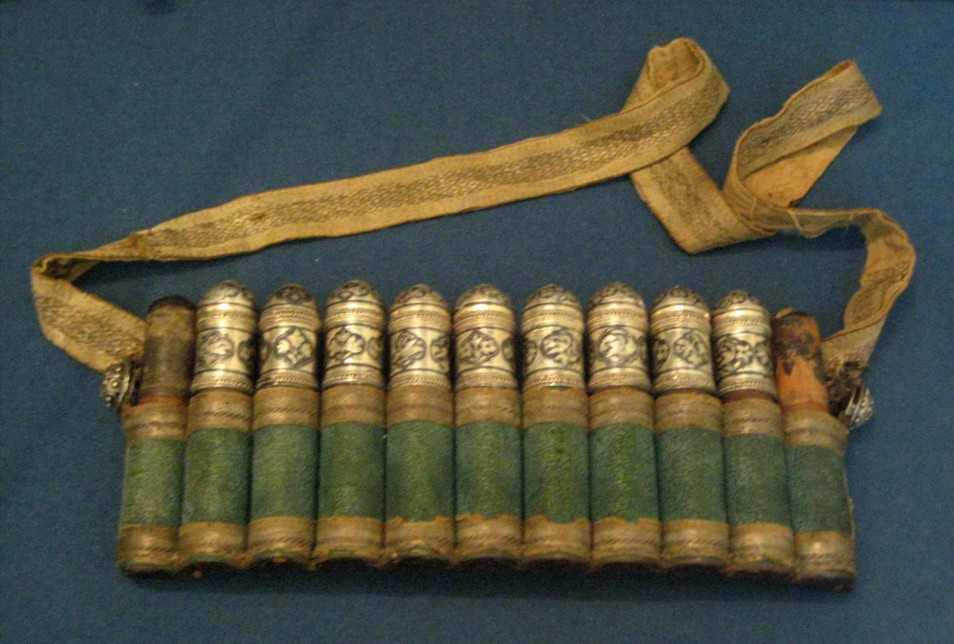
Dagestani Gazyr bag from Kubachi

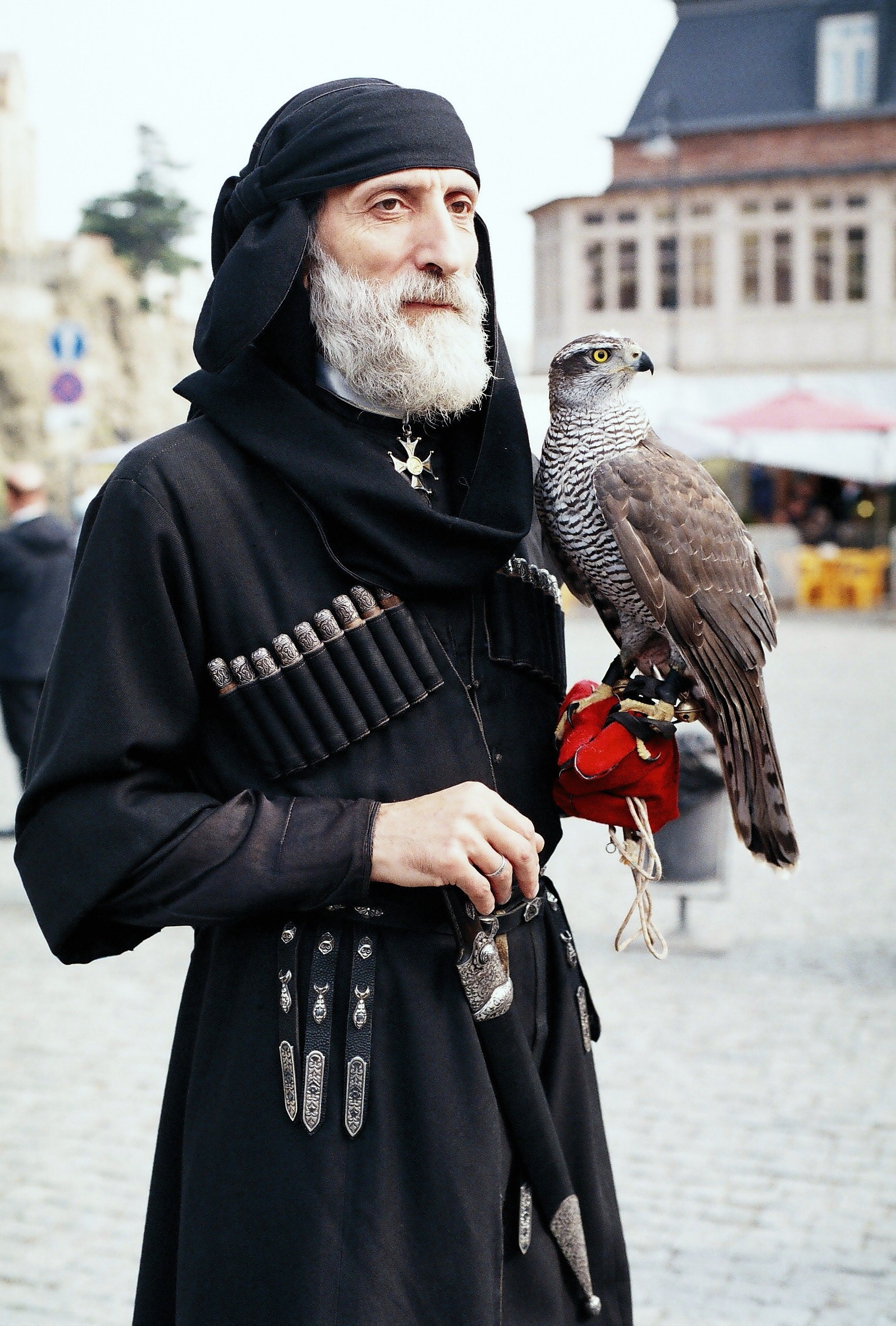
A Georgian man in chokha

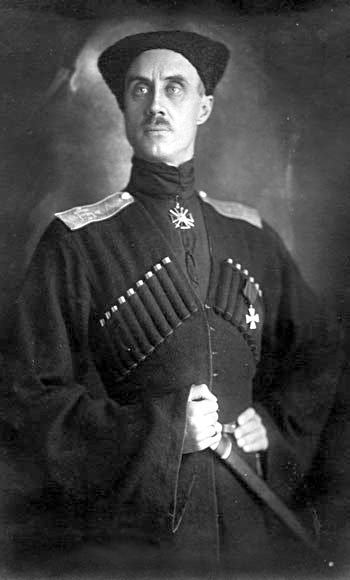
Baron Pyotr Wrangel in Russian Cossack uniform

A gazyr (Abkhaz: Аҳазырҭрақәа/а-хьазыр, Adyghe: хьэзыр, Armenian: Գազիրներ, Avar: Роцен, Azerbaijani: Vəznə, Chechen: Бустамаш bustamash, Dargin: Буста/Бустат, Ingush: Бустамаш, Ossetian: Бæрцытæ, Georgian: მასრები masrebi, Lak: чила, Lezgin: Везнеяр, Russian: газырь from Turkish hazır, "ready", ultimately from Arabic) is an implement to hold a rifle charge: a tube with a bullet and a measure of gunpowder or a paper cartridge. They were carried in gazyr bags or in rows of small pockets on the breast. Later, gazyr pockets became a distinctive element of national dress of the peoples of Caucasus, such as the chokha.

Gazyr breast pockets ("gazyrs") were borrowed by Russian Cossacks, together with other elements of Caucasus peoples' outfit, as part of their military uniform.

== See also ==
- Bandolier
