= Caftan (Metropolitan Museum of Art) =

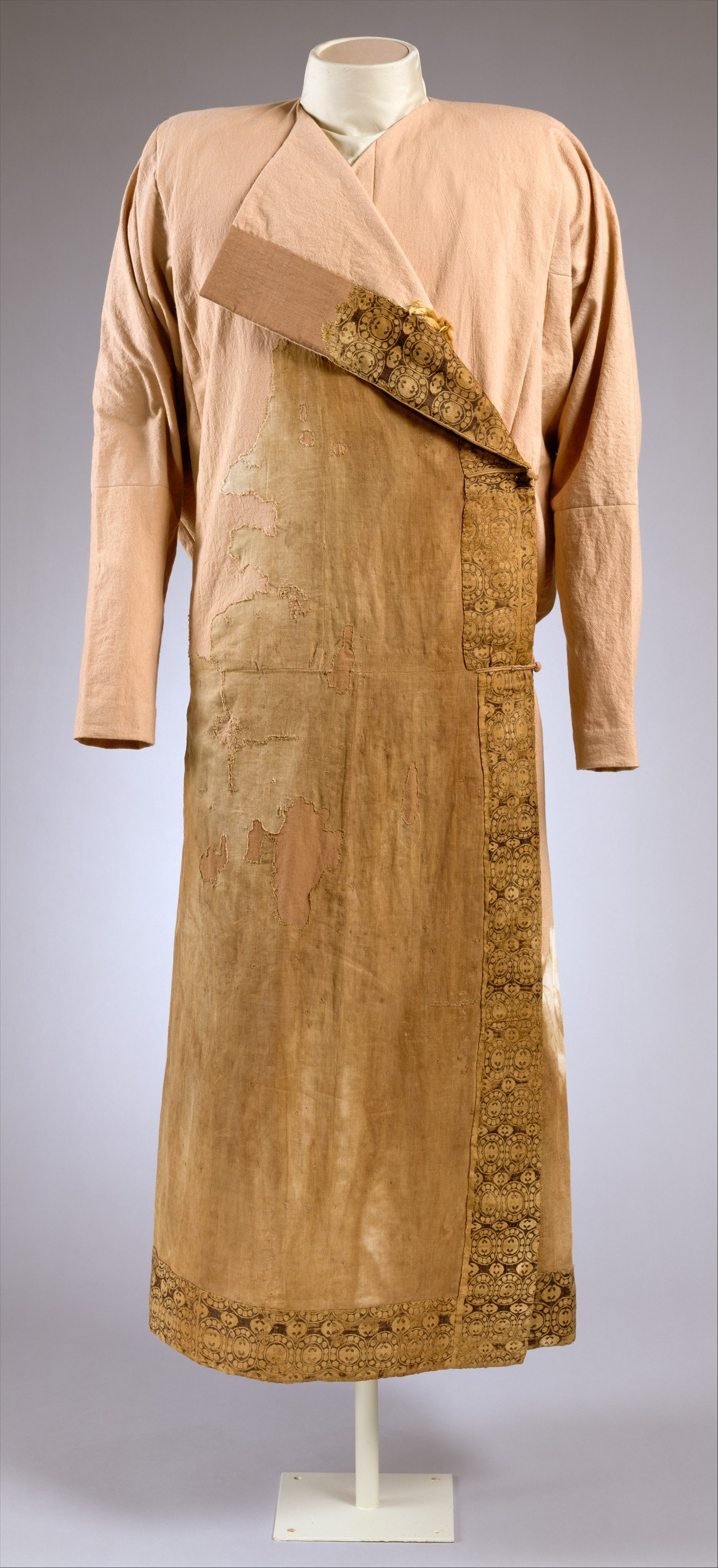
- Year: 8th century
- Location: Metropolitan Museum of Art
- Accession No.: 1996.78.1
- Identifiers: The Met object ID: 327518

A caftan or coat of linen with silk borders in the collection of the Metropolitan Museum of Art represents the typical clothing worn by horsemen along the Silk Road in the North Caucasus during the 8th–10th centuries. The caftan is reconstructed from garment fragments excavated from a burial ground near Moshchevaja Balka (located by the Bolshaya Laba River in Karachay-Cherkessia, on the Pontic–Caspian steppe). Moshchevaja Balka is considered part of the Saltovo-Mayaki archaeological culture.

The caftan is associated with a pair of silk leggings with linen feet, also in the Met. Along with fragmentary garments from Moshchevaja Balka in the collection of the Hermitage Museum in Saint Petersburg, the caftan and leggings represent rare survivals of garments from the Caucasus, where the climate—unlike that of more arid regions—is not generally conducive to the preservation of organic materials.

== Context ==
The Silk Road was the great overland trade route of the Ancient World, carrying goods including silks from China to the Mediterranean. By the 6th century C.E., tensions between Byzantium and the Sasanian Empire disrupted trade along the traditional route. Central Asian merchants developed a new route to Byzantium, going north from the Caspian Sea and crossing the Caucasus Mountains via steep passes (most prominently in the North Caucasus, the Darial Gorge). The first caravan carrying Chinese silks traveled via this North Caucasus route in 568. The Caucasus silk routes remained in use through the Middle Ages, losing their importance only in the 14th century.

In the 20th century, many textile finds of this period were discovered near the mountain passes and on the piedmont below. The main site is a burial ground at Moshchevaja Balka ("Ravine of the Mummies or Relics"), in a densely wooded area about 1,000 meters (3,300 ft) above sea level. Anna A. Ierusalimskaja, curator of the North Caucasian antiquities in the Hermitage, has written extensively on the finds (in Russian and in German), but Elfriede R. Knauer concludes that "neither the age and places of manufacture of the majority of Chinese silks nor of those from the eastern Mediterranean recovered at the North Caucasian sites can as yet be defined with absolute certainty. In the absence of further criteria, Ierusalimskaja's dates can only be accepted with caution."

These finds provide the context for the Met's caftan. It is consistent with documented finds from Moshchevaja Balka, where several tribes of the North Caucasus "seem to have shared a fairly uniform and—were it not for the textile finds—unspectacular material culture, known as the Saltovo-Majaki culture". The wearer could have been a man from Alania, in a region then under Khazar domination. These tribal horsemen would have served as local guides and carriers, collecting short lengths of silk as "tolls and rewards" in kind from among the textiles shipped via the northern route of the ancient Silk Road.

== Construction ==
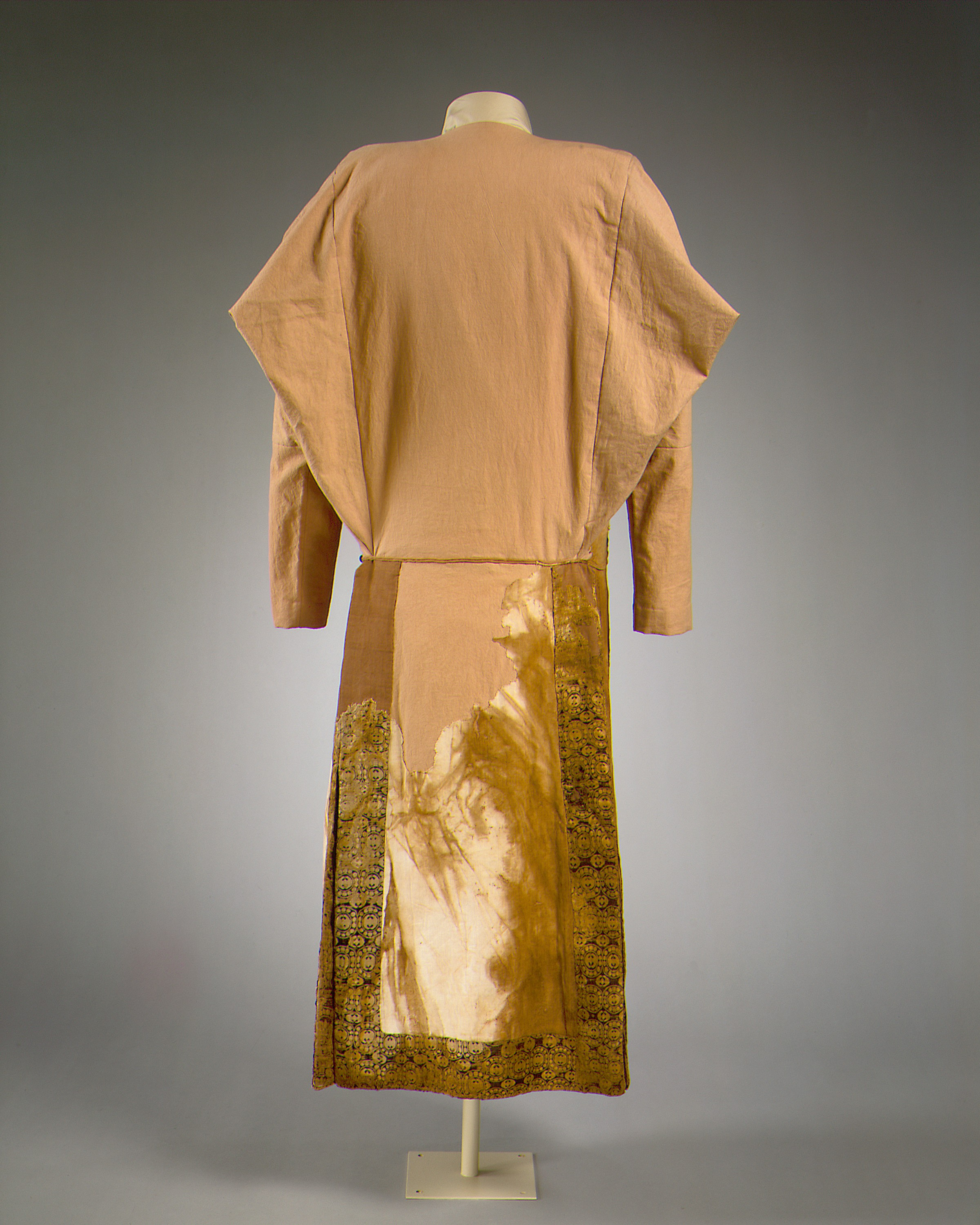
Rear view of the caftan, showing the silk borders on the slits of the skirt panels.

The caftan is made of dense, bleached plain weave linen, now discolored from the grave. It is trimmed with a border of two distinct woven silk textiles, and had a sheepskin lining of which only traces remain. The cut or shape of the caftan is distinctive to men's coats of the Adygo-Alanic tribes of the central Caucasus, although the style shows influences from Persia, Central Asia, and the nomads of the steppe.

The caftan is fitted to the upper body and has a flared skirt attached at the waist. The front is double-breasted, with the "proper left front closing toward the right and the right front overlapping it". Two long slits at the back, below the hipline, also trimmed with silk borders, accommodate a seated rider. The garment is secured with three sets of frogs, fabric-covered buttons and twisted loops of cording made of bias-cut strips of linen. The caftan is made from linen cloth woven as a bolt of fabric and cut using a "semistraight" structure, with triangles and trapezoids—some of them pieced from smaller fragments of cloth—assembled to shape the garment. This type of construction is common to traditional garments of Eastern Europe and Western Asia.

The lower sleeves and upper neckline of the caftan have not survived, and it is unknown whether a collar or cuffs were part of the garment. The pieces are sewn with linen thread in neat flat-felled seams, and the upper body and skirts were assembled and trimmed separately before being joined at the waist. "Overall, the high quality of the linen cloth, garment design, cutting, assembling, and sewing demonstrated remarkable professional coordination in comparison with contemporaneous examples from other cultures, attesting to this region's elevated standards in artistic and technical achievements regarding textile culture and perhaps even social decorum.'

== Silk borders ==
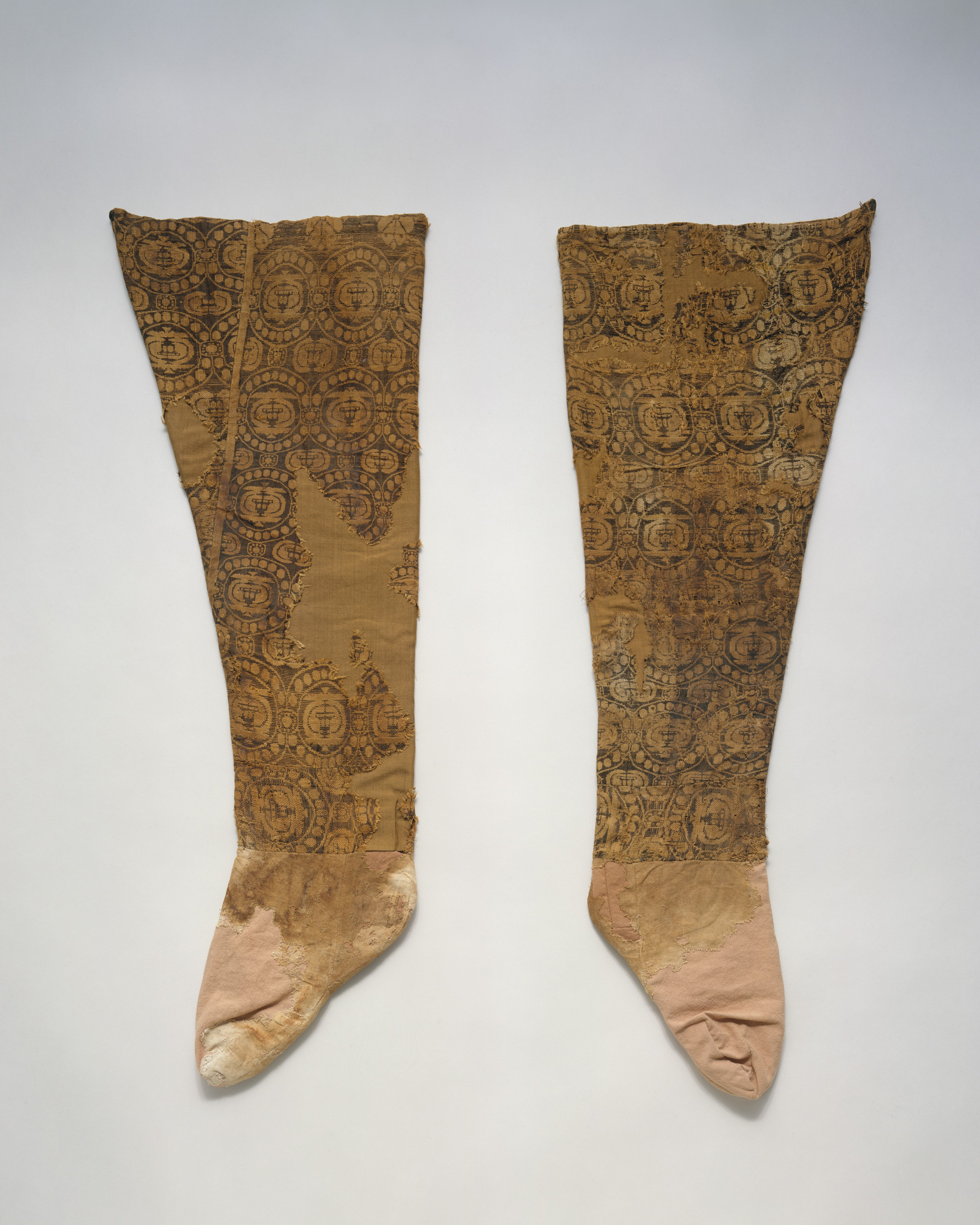
Silk leggings associated with the caftan.

The caftan's borders, each about 8 centimetres (3.1 in) wide, are made of two different designs of polychrome samite (weft-faced compound twill weave) patterned silks. One textile is used for the lapels and the outer border of the lower panels, and the second for the inner border of the lower panels. Both would be visible when the garment was worn. The silk borders are pieced (one from three different bolts of the same general design). They are padded with wool wadding to approximate the thickness of the linen coat with its sheepskin lining. The two silks now appear as patterns of off-white on dark brown, but analysis shows that each is patterned in four colors. It is no longer possible to determine with certainty what colors were used; likely, the designs were originally dark blue from an indigotin-bearing plant, yellow, brilliant red from safflower, and white (undyed silk) on a dark brown or black ground.

Ierusalimskaja categorized the silk fragments found at Moshchevaja Balka into groups by likely origin. The majority are suggested to be Sogdian, products of silk-weaving centers in the region surrounding Samarkand. However, within this group is a subset, including the trims on the caftan, that is probably of purely local origin. "Fragments of this very circumscribed group have so far not been unearthed beyond sites in the northwestern Caucasus. ... Within the range of "Sogdian" they are technically much inferior to the rest of the material, in both dyeing and weaving." Safflower red dye, especially, degrades rapidly, but all of the dyes used in the silk borders are of poor quality. The circle-and-cross designs are simplified, and the roundels themselves vary in size and shape. All of these factors suggest rural production, likely intended for export.
