= Cappella Marciana =

Choir and instrumentalists of St Mark's Basilica, Venice, Italy

The Cappella Marciana is the modern name for the choir and instrumentalists of St Mark's Basilica, Venice, Italy.

== Overview ==
The masters of the cappella ducale in the 16th and 17th centuries included many of the most notable composers of the Italian baroque. In addition to providing music at the Basilica, the choir and instrumentalists of the cappella performed important functions in the Venetian calendar of feasts.

Many of the works of the maestri di cappella are preserved in illuminated choir books at the Archivio di Stato di Venezia (ASV), the Biblioteca del Civico Museo Correr and the Biblioteca Nazionale Marciana.

== History ==
=== Maestri di cappella ===
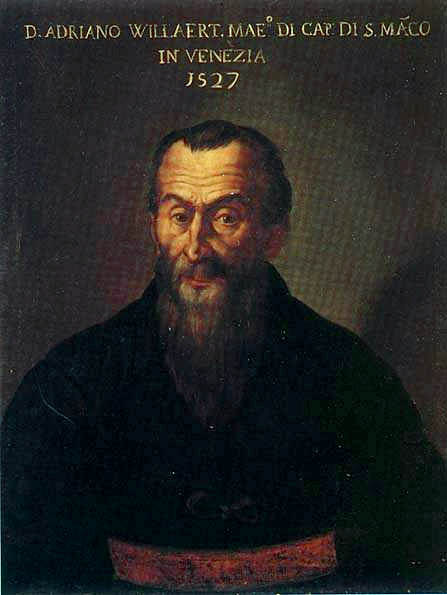
Adrian Willaert

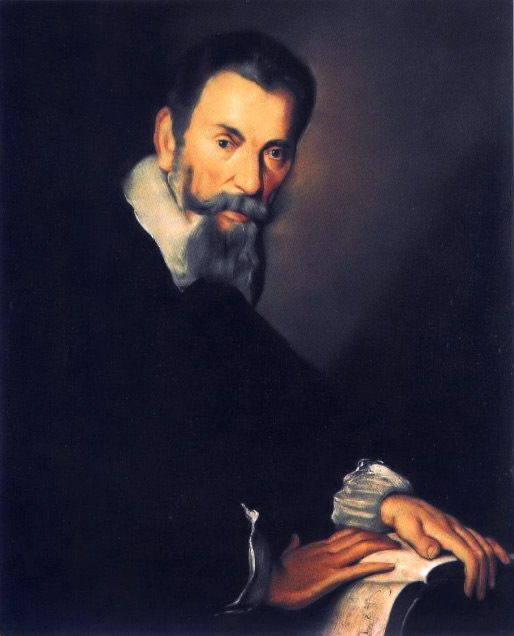
Claudio Monteverdi

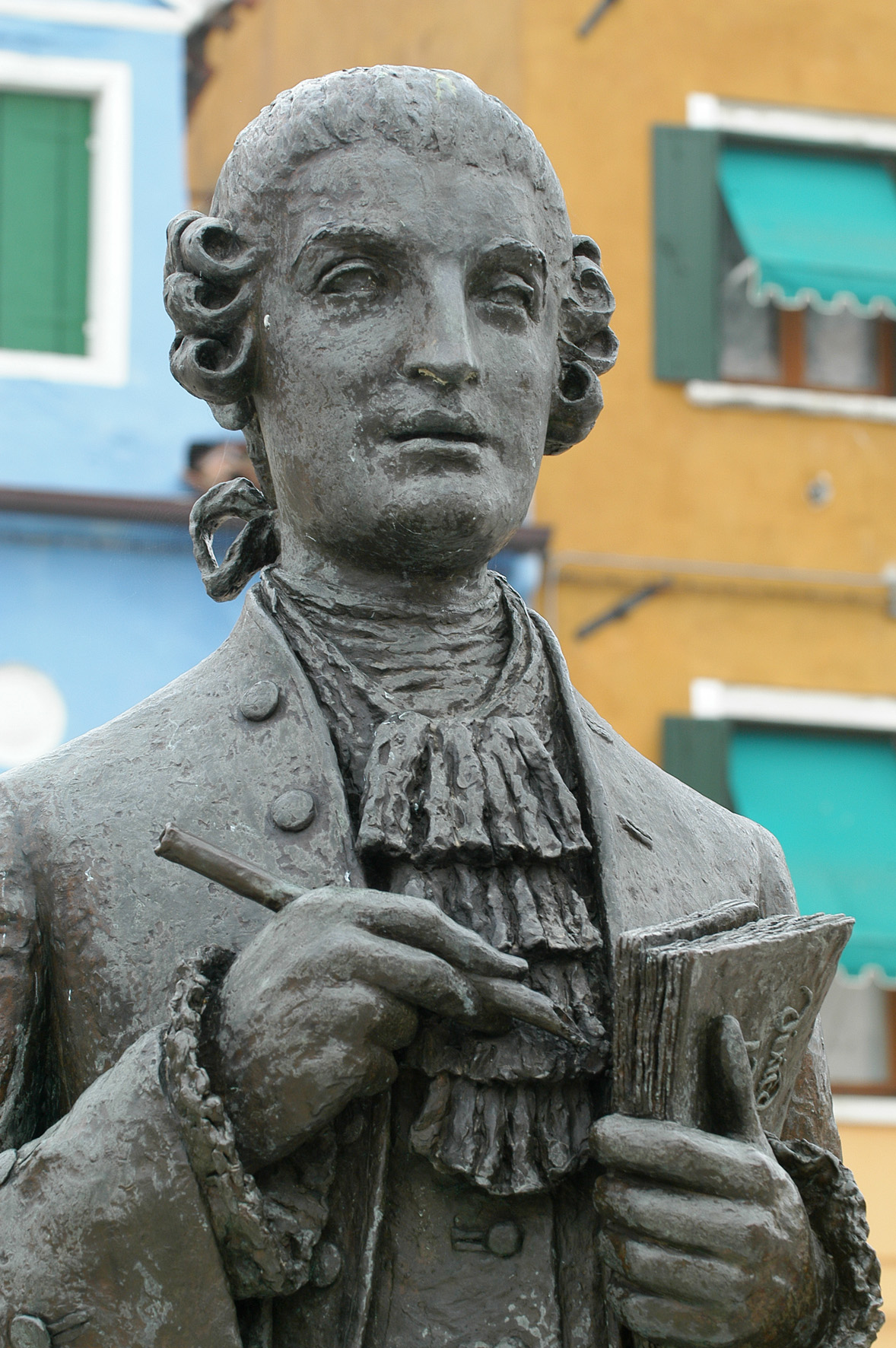
Baldassare Galuppi

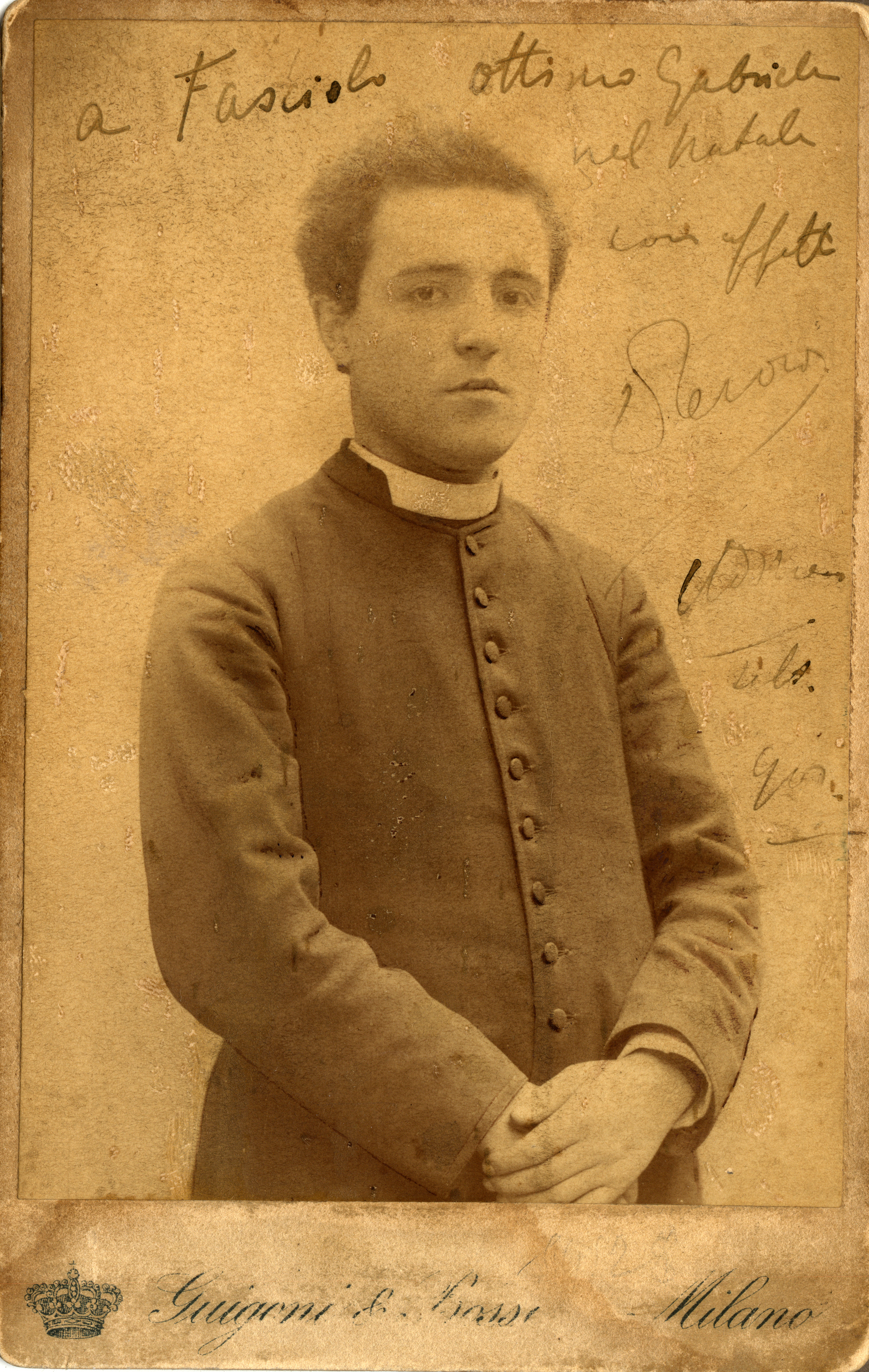
Don Lorenzo Perosi

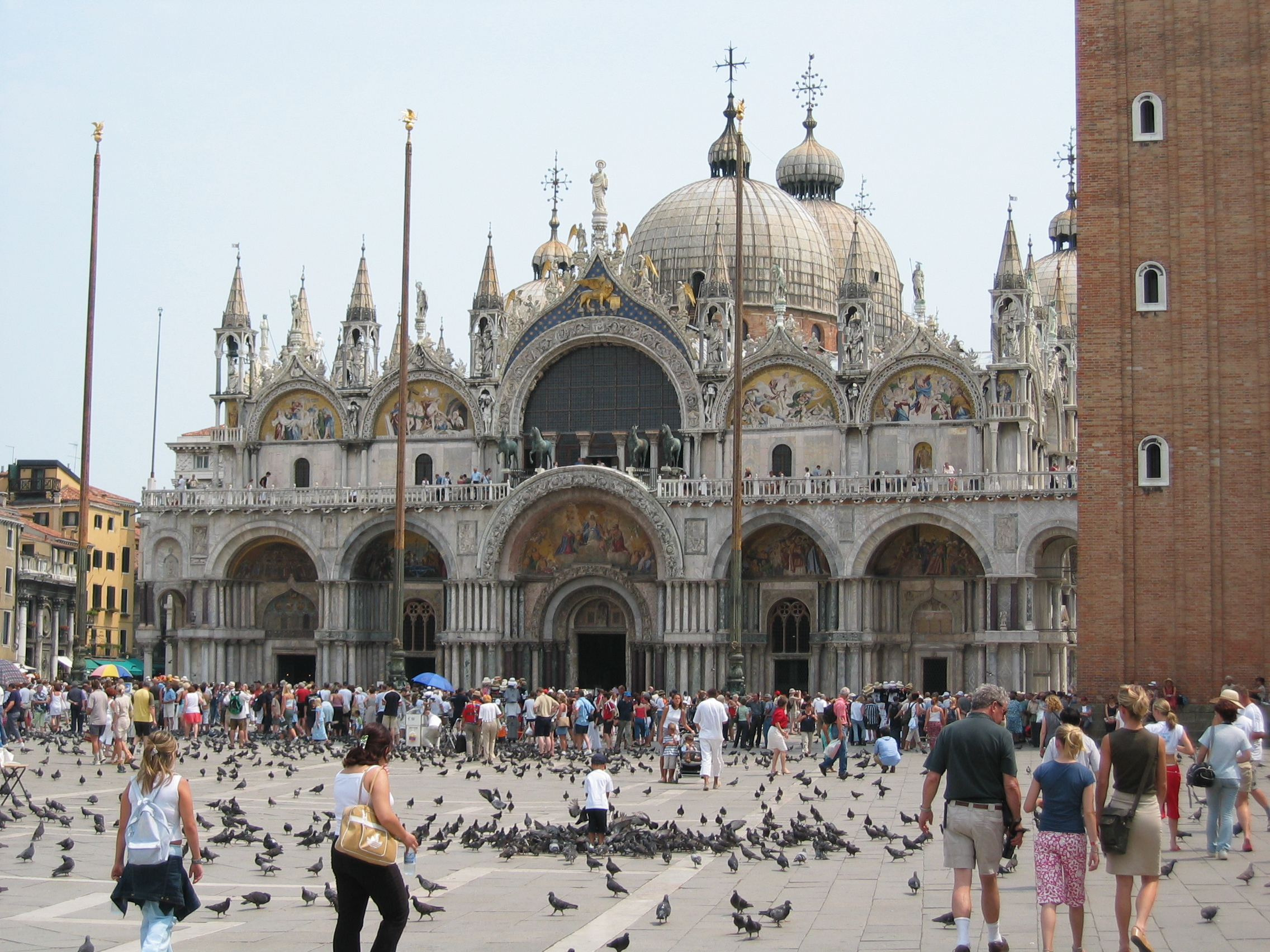
Front of the basilica

The list of maestri, musical directors, and organists includes:

- Johannes de Quadris (1463-1491)
- Pietro de Fossis (1491-1527)
- Adrian Willaert (1527-1563)
- Cipriano de Rore (1563-1565)
- Gioseffo Zarlino (1565-1590)
- Baldassare Donato (1590-1605)
- Giovanni Croce (1605-1609)
- Giulio Cesare Martinengo (1609-1613)
- Claudio Monteverdi (1613-1644)
- Giovanni Rovetta (1644-1668)
- Francesco Cavalli (1668-1676)
- Natale Monferrato (1676-1685)
- Giovanni Legrenzi (1685-1690)
- Giovanni Battista Volpe (1690-1692)
- Gian Domenico Partenio (1692-1702)
- Antonio Biffi (1702-1736)
- Antonio Lotti (1736-1740)
- Antonio Pollarolo (1740-1747)
- Giacomo Giuseppe Saratelli (1747-1762)
- Baldassarre Galuppi (1762-1785)
- Ferdinando Bertoni (1785-1808)
- Bonaventura Furlanetto (1808-1811)
- Giovanni Agostino Perotti (1811-1855)
- Antonio Buzzolla (1855-1871)
- Nicolò Coccon (1871-1894)
- Lorenzo Perosi (1894-1898)
- Pietro Magri (1898-1899)
- Giulio Bas (1899-1900)
- Delfino Thermignon (1900-1921)
- Umberto Ravetta (1921-1926)
- Matteo Tosi (1926-1938)
- Gastone De Zuccoli (1938-1939)
- Luigi Vio (1939-1954)
- Alfredo Bravi (1954-1981)
- Roberto Micconi (1981-2000)
- Marco Gemmani since 2000

=== First Organists ===
- Zucchetto (1316-1336)
- Francesco da Pesaro (1336-1369)
- Giandomenico Dattolo (1369-1375)
- Andrea da San Silvestro (1375-1379)
- Joannino Tagiapiera (1379-1389)
- Antonio de' Servi (1389-1397)
- Filippo (1397-1406)
- Zuanne (1406-1414)
- Antonio Romano (1414-1419)
- Bernardino (1419-1445)
- Bernardo di Stefano Murer (1445-1459)
- Bartolomeo di Batista de Vielmis (1459-1504)
- Zuan Maria di Marino (1504-1507)
- Dionisio Memmo (1507-1516)
- Giovanni Armonio (1516-1552)
- Annibale Padovano (1552-1566)
- Claudio Merulo (1566-1584)
- Andrea Gabrieli (1584-1585)
- Giovanni Gabrieli (1585-1612)
- Giampaolo Savi (1612-1619)
- Giovanni Battista Grillo (1619-1621)
- Francesco Usper (1621-1623)
- Carlo Filago (1623-1644)
- Massimiliano Neri (1644-1665)
- Francesco Cavalli (1665-1668)
- Giovanni Antonio Gianettini (1668-1669)
- Pietro Andrea Ziani (1669-1670)
- Giovanni Battista Volpe (1678-1690)
- Giacomo Filippo Spada (1690-1706)
- Antonio Lotti (1706-1736)
- Giacomo Giuseppe Saratelli (1736)
- Agostino Bonaventura Coletti (1736-1752)
- Ferdinando Bertoni (1752-1785)
- Giovanni Battista Grazioli (1785-1821)
- Carlo Faggi (1821-1856)
- Nicolò Coccon (1856-1873)
- Giuseppe Manfrini (1873-1875)
- Andrea Girardi (1875-1895)
- Oreste Ravanello (1895-1904)
- Giovanni Pittau (1904-1956)
- Carmelo Pavan (1956-1975)
- Roberto Micconi (1975-2016)
- Pierpaolo Turetta (2016-2021)
- Alvise Mason since 2021

== The modern cappella ==
A boys choir was added 1890, disbanded 1960. In 2002, the Solisti della Cappella Marciana were formed as a concert giving orchestra. The current Maestro di Cappella from 2000 is Marco Gemmani, and Main Organist from 2021 is Alvise Mason.
