= Giovanni Battista Riccio =

Italian composer

Giovanni Battista Riccio (Giambattista Riccio) (late 16th century – after 1621) was a musician and composer of the early Baroque era, resident in Venice, most notable for his development of instrumental forms, particularly utilizing the recorder. He was appointed organist at the Scuola di San Giovanni Evangelista, Venice in 1609 and published three books of vocal and instrumental music.

== Life and music ==
No details are available regarding the early part of his life, but he must have been born in the late sixteenth century.

Records show that he was appointed as organist at the Scuola di San Giovanni Evangelista, Venice in 1609, when he was the preferred choice over Gabriel Sponga (a nephew of Francesco Usper). He was probably also a violinist.

Riccio is known to have published three books of vocal and instrumental music in Venice. These books include his instrumental works for recorder—unusual for Venetian music at the time, although Giovanni Picchi also wrote for the instrument.

The initial publication date of Riccio's Primo Libro is unknown, but the reprint dating from 1612 survives. The majority of the first book is allotted to vocal works, but in the revised edition two new instrumental canzonas are appended. One is his first known piece for recorder—a canzone for two flautini.

His Secondo Libro, also published in Venice, appeared in 1614.

His Terzo libro delle Divine Lodi published in 1620 and 1621 is the most widely known today. It comprises thirty-six vocal works and a further twelve instrumental pieces mostly described as canzonas. Most feature two main instruments (such as recorder, cornetto, violin, trombone or sometimes contemporary bassoon or dulcian). One canzona entitled La Grimantea con il tremolo is one of the first pieces to make use of the tremolo technique for the 'Flautin e Fagotto' (recorder and bassoon).

Dedications in his works suggest Riccio knew other composers such as Giovanni Picchi, Alessandro Grandi, Giovanni Battista Grillo and Giacomo Finetti. Some of his canzonas quote from larger-scale works by Giovanni Gabrieli.

== Works ==
- Primo libro delle Divine Lodi (Venice, Revised edition 1612)
- Il secondo libro delle Divine Lodi (Venice, 1614)
- Il terzo libro delle Divine Lodi (Venice, 1620; 1621)
- He may also be the composer of one canzona in Valerio Bona's Otto ordini di litanie (Venice, 1619)

== Sources ==
- Eleanor Selfridge-Field, Venetian instrumental music from Gabrieli to Vivaldi, Third Revised Edition, Dover Publications, New York, 1994. ISBN 0-486-28151-5.
- Bruce Dickey, liner notes in Effetti e Stravaganze – Affect and Effect in 17th Century Instrumental Music, Concerto Palatino. Audio CD (recorded 1994), Accent Records, Belgium, 1998. ACC 94102 D.
