= Audi benigne Conditor =

Latin hymn used during Lent

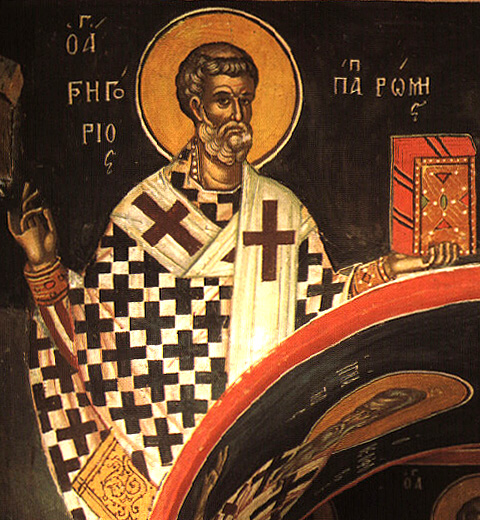
Fresco of Saint Gregory the Pope of Rome at Stavronikita - Theophanes the Cretan

Audi benigne Conditor is a Latin hymn used during Lent attributed to Gregory the Great, who reigned as pope from the year 590 until the year 604.

== Textual analysis ==
=== Textual criticism ===
The lyrics of Audi benigne Conditor are ascribed to Gregory the Great, though according to Christian Raby it is not possible to connect with Gregory or with anyone else the authorship of this hymn. It is written as five strophes of octosyllabic iambic dimeter. As proof of its antiquity, half of its 20 lines are rhymed, in the unschematic manner characteristic of pre-Carolingian prosody. Matthew Britt notices that jejuna, with the genitive criminum is a Grecism: such adjectives are normally followed by the ablative, but classical authors vary their construction.

The first four strophes each contain a reference to human infirmity and a request for divine assistance; the fifth concludes this simple theme with a prayer that the Trinity will make our fasting fruitful.

Pope Urban VIII made changes to the text in 1632 version of the Roman Breviary : v. 11, "Ad nominis laudem tui" instead of "Ad laudem tui nominis" ; and the whole 4th stanza as : "Condede nostrum conteri / Corpus per abstinentiam / Culpæ ut relinquant pabulum / Jejuna corda criminum".

The text was translated into English for the English Hymnal by Thomas Alexander Lacey and others in 1906, so that twenty-five different English translations existed in 1936.

=== Lyrics ===
Audi benigne Conditor
Latin	English translation by Thomas Alexander Lacey
Audi, benigne Conditor, nostras preces cum fletibus, sacrata in abstinentia fusas quadragenaria.	O merciful Creator, hear! To us in pity bow Thine ear: accept the tearful prayer we raise in this our fast of forty days.
Scrutator alme cordium, infirma tu scis virium; ad te reversis exhibere missionis gratiam.	Our hearts are open, Lord, to Thee: Thou knowest our infirmity; pour out on all who seek Thy face abundance of Thy pardoning grace.
Multum quidem peccavimus, sed parce confitentibus, tuique laude nominis confer medelam languidis.	Our sins are many, this we know; spare us, good Lord, Thy mercy show; and for the honor of Thy name our fainting souls to life reclaim.
Sic corpus extra conteri dona per abstinentiam, ieiunet ut mens sobria a labe prorsus criminum.	Give us self-control that springs from discipline of outward things, that fasting inward secretly the soul may purely dwell with Thee.
Praesta, beata Trinitas, concede, simplex Unitas, ut fructuosa sint tuis haec parcitatis munera. Amen.	We pray Thee, Holy Trinity, one God, unchanging Unity, that we from this our abstinence may reap the fruits of penitence. Amen.

The text of this hymn has also been revised by Dom Lentini, detailing his changes in his book Te Decet Hymni published in 1984. Dom Anselmo Lentini (1901-1989), a monk of the abbey of Montecassino, was the head of the cœtus (subcommittee) that reformed the Office hymns, and this book is the official account of their work. For verses 3-4, he writes: "Originally “in hoc sacro ieiunio | fusas quadragenario”; given current ecclesiastical rules on fasting, in this and other hymns of Lent, the relevant verses had to be modified." For verse 11, he writes: "There are several variants among editions; the most common is ad laudem tui nominis, with a metrical error (-dem tui) that makes it suspect; we have preferred the simple correction that appears in the text." For verse 20, he writes: "Hæc parcitatis : originally, jejuniorium".

== Music ==
In the 15th century, Guillaume Dufay composed a polyphony based on a paraphrase of the plainchant melody of Audi benigne Conditor using faux-bourdon texture as he instituted the practice of singing polyphonic hymns and motets during his tenure at the Cathedral of Cambrai. His musical setting was still stropich and the melody served as a coherent thread through the hymn, as an audible point of reference, sung alternatim, with polyphonic chant alternating with unembellished plainchant, thus "[rooting] the liturgical celebration in the plainchant tradition while elevating the theological messages expressed in it".

Around 1565, Orlando di Lasso composed a polyphonic motet on Audi benigne Conditor with only two parts and five voices, but a rich texture with florid writing for the bass voices especially and frequent text illustration such a 6/3 chords in a chain of suspensions at "poenasque comparavimus".

In his collection published in 1612 for the Collegiate church of Saint-Quentin, Jean de Bournonville offered a new version of Audi benigne Conditor among rich polyphonic materials essentially for vespers, according to the new orientations of Church music imposed by the Council of Trent. The flowery counterpoint is almost excluded, in favor of faux-bourdons or formulas close to the faux-bourdon, favoring the clear understanding of the texts by the faithful. The liturgical Gregorian chant is found in the Tenor part, as is usual. The Bournonville polyphony is designed to alternate with a choir singing the liturgical plainchant. Guillaume Bouzignac, chapel master of the cathedrals of Angoulême, Bourges, Rodez, Clermont-Ferrand and the Collegiate church of Saint-André in Grenoble, also composed polyphonic alternations of the Lenten hymn Audi benigne Conditor. The cantus firmus of the plainsong is given to the bass part, so the music for these polyphonic alternations is written in the second ecclesiastical tone.

Various polyphonic arrangements have been made through time, as one by Italian composer Delfino Thermignon composed for three male voices: published in 1903 in the Secunda anthologia vocalis of Oreste Ravanello, it became popular even in the United States in the early 1920s.

== Liturgical use ==
Since at least the compilation of the Roman Breviary and to this day, the hymn has enjoyed a certain "liturgical prominence" in the post-Tridentine rite and is sung at Vespers during Lent, until Passiontide.

It was used for Vespers during Lent from Ash Wednesday to Passion Sunday in the Paris Breviary of 1736. In the Ambrosian Breviary, it was used for both Vespers and Lauds, while it was used for Lauds only during the first three weeks of Lent in the Sarum Breviary.
