= Gian Domenico Partenio =

Italian composer

Gian Domenico Partenio (c. 1650 – 1710) was a Venetian composer of operas during the Baroque period. He served as vice maestro of St Mark's Basilica's Cappella Marciana from 1685, before succeeding Giovanni Battista Volpe as maestro di cappella from 1692 until 1701.

In 1672, he composed the music for Cristoforo Ivanovich's La costanza trionfante, which premiered at Venice's San Moisè church.

Partenio collaborated frequently with the librettist Matteo Noris. In November 1681, their opera Flavio Cuniberto was performed for the first time in the Teatro San Giovanni Grisostomo. A revised version of the opera premiered in the same theatre in 1687, with a new aria for the role of Theodata. In the same year, he composed the music for the second and third acts of Noris' Dionisio, which was performed in the Teatro Santi Giovanni e Paolo. In 1682, he composed music for the first act of Nicolò Minato's La bugia regnante, which was performed at a theatre in the Cannaregio district of Venice.

He is also believed to have composed music for Nicolò Beregan's Il Genserico. It premiered in 1669 at the Santi Giovanni e Paolo church, and has music also attributed to Antonio Cesti.

== Compositions ==
- Il Genserico, libretto by Nicolò Beregan (premiered 1669; attributed)
- La costanza trionfante, libretto by Cristoforo Ivanovich (premiered 1672)
- Flavio Cuniberto, libretto by Matteo Noris (premiered 1681; revised in 1687)
- Dionisio, libretto by Matteo Noris (premiered 1681; acts 2 & 3)
- La bugia regnante, libretto by Nicolò Minato (premiered 1682; act 1)
