= Nicolò Coccon =

Italian composer

Nicolò Coccon (10 August 1826 – 4 August 1903) was an Italian composer, conductor, organist and teacher from Venice.

== Life ==
He was born in Venice on 10 August 1826 and studied with Fabio Ermagora, a pupil of Bonaventura Furlanetto.

In 1856 he was appointed organist and vice Maestro of the Cappella Marciana at San Marco's Basilica in Venice. Coccon succeeded Antonio Buzzolla when he retired in 1871. He was teacher of counterpoint at the Liceo Musicale Benedetto Marcello (1882–1897).

Coccon left the position of Maestro in 1894 for the conflicts with his vice Giovanni Tebaldini promoter of the Cecilian reform.

== Compositions ==
=== Sacred music ===
- 8 Requiem:
  - Requiem per l'Arciduca l'Austria Federico (1850)
  - Messa di Requiem a quattro con orchestra e soli (1879)
- 30 Masses
  - Messa in fa a 4 voci e orchestra (1871)
  - Piccola Messa in re a 4 voci ed orchestra (1875)
  - 3 Messe annuali d'obbligo pel S. Natale (1875, 1877, 1879)
  - Messa per la Cappella di S.S. Andrea e Ambrogio a Genova (1869)
- 5 Salmi per la Cappella di S.S. Andrea e Ambrogio a Genova (1869)
- several unpublished works

=== Operas ===
- Manasse in Babilonia, (Venezia, orfanotrofio dei Gesuati, 15 marzo 1877);
- I due orangotani, operetta (Venezia, orfanotrofio dei Gesuati, 17 apr.ile 1879);
- Saul, dramma sacro in tre atti (Spello, Collegio Rossi, 10 febbraio 1884);
- Uggero il Danese (unpublished);
- Zaira (unpublished).

=== Compositions for band ===
- Pensiero funebre per grande orchestra a Daniele Manin (1868);
- Barcarola, per banda e coro a 4 (1847);
- Inno a Carlo Goldoni;
- Sinfonia Umberto, a Umberto I of Italy.

== Sources ==
- De Angelis, Alberto: L'Italia musicale d'oggi, dizionario dei musicisti (1918)
