= Natale Monferrato =

Italian Baroque composer

Natale Monferrato (1603–1685) was an Italian baroque composer. He was a pupil of Giovanni Rovetta, then was a singer at St Mark's Basilica in Venice, and then with the aid of Francesco Cavalli vicemaestro, or maestro di coro (1647–76). On 30 April 1676, he became director, after a competition with Giovanni Legrenzi, another of Rovetta's pupils, and Pietro Andrea Ziani. He was earlier maestro at the Mendicanti. He was the financial backer of the Venetian music publisher Giuseppe Sala.

Following his death, the junior post of maestro di coro fell to Giandomenico Partenio (1685–89), then Antonino Biffi (1699–1730).

== Works, editions and recordings ==
- Edition: Alma redemptoris mater 1962 - 10 pages
- Edition: Natale Monferrato, Complete Masses, edited by Jonathan R. J. Drennan, Recent Researches in the Music of the Baroque Era, vol. 186 (Middleton, Wis.: A-R Editions, 2014)
- Recording: Alma redemptoris mater; Psalm. Carolyn Watkinson, Gonzaga Band, Chandos Classics, 2011.
