= Giacomo Giuseppe Saratelli =

Italian composer

Giacomo Giuseppe Saratelli (1682-1762) was an Italian organist, composer and maestro di cappella.

== Life ==
He was born and raised in Bologna, Papal States, where he premiered his first work (an oratorio) in 1699 and was trained as an organist. He moved to Padua in 1714 and in 1736 succeeded Antonio Lotti as chief organist at St Mark's Basilica in Venice. In 1740 he became Vice Maestro of the Cappella Marciana. From 1732 to 1739 he was choirmaster of Venice's Ospedale dei Mendicanti, one of the era's most prestigious music schools. In 1747 he became Maestro di Cappella at St Mark's, a post he held until his death in Venice in 1762.

== Works ==
=== Sacred music ===
- 150 psalm settings, including:
  - Laudate pueri (Psalm 112), for choir, orchestra and basso continuo
  - Ad Dominum cum tribularer (Psalm 119)
  - Levavi oculos meos (Psalm 120)
  - Ad te levavi oculos meos (Psalm 122)
  - Nisi quia Dominus (Psalm 123)
  - Qui confidunt (Psalm 124)
- Oratorios:
  - La regina Ester (Queen Esther)
  - Maddalena Conversio (Mary Magdalene Converted; libretto by Carlo Goldoni)
- Veni creator spiritus (Come Creator Spirit; for three voices)
- A collection of important partimenti for harpsichord or organ (surviving copies now in Venice, Milan, Münster, Berlin and Munich)
