= Pietro Magri =

Italian composer, conductor and organist

Pietro Magri (May 10, 1873 in Vigarano Mainarda – July 24, 1937 in Oropa) was an Italian composer, conductor and organist.

== Life ==
Magri studied in the seminary of Faenza where he became priest and taught singing from 1889 to 1894. After a short appointment in Venice as Maestro of the Cappella Marciana in 1898 he moved to Bari. There he founded the magazine Il Ceciliano. In the next years he moved to Lecce (1910), Molfetta and Vercelli (1912) and finally to Oropa (1919) where he remained until his death in 1937.

== Compositions ==
- Missa S. Francesco di Sales
- Missa defunctorum simplex
- Missa in homorem B. Virginis Auxilium christianorum
- Missa Joseph fili David

== Sources ==
- De Angelis, Alberto: L'Italia musicale d'oggi, dizionario dei musicisti (1918)
