= Scuola Grande di San Giovanni Evangelista =

Building in Venice, Italy

Coordinates: 45.438°N 12.326°E

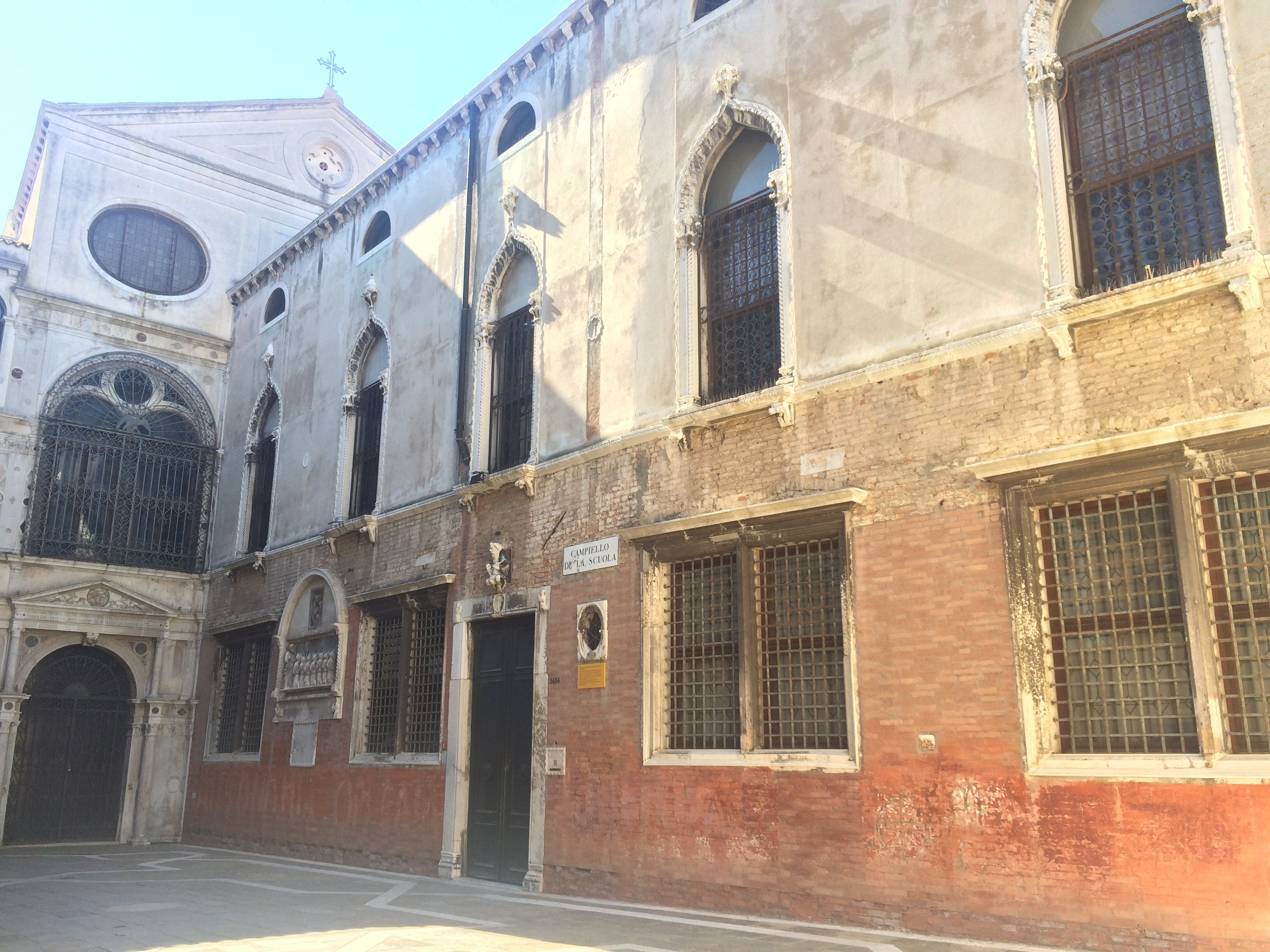
Façade of the Scuola Grande

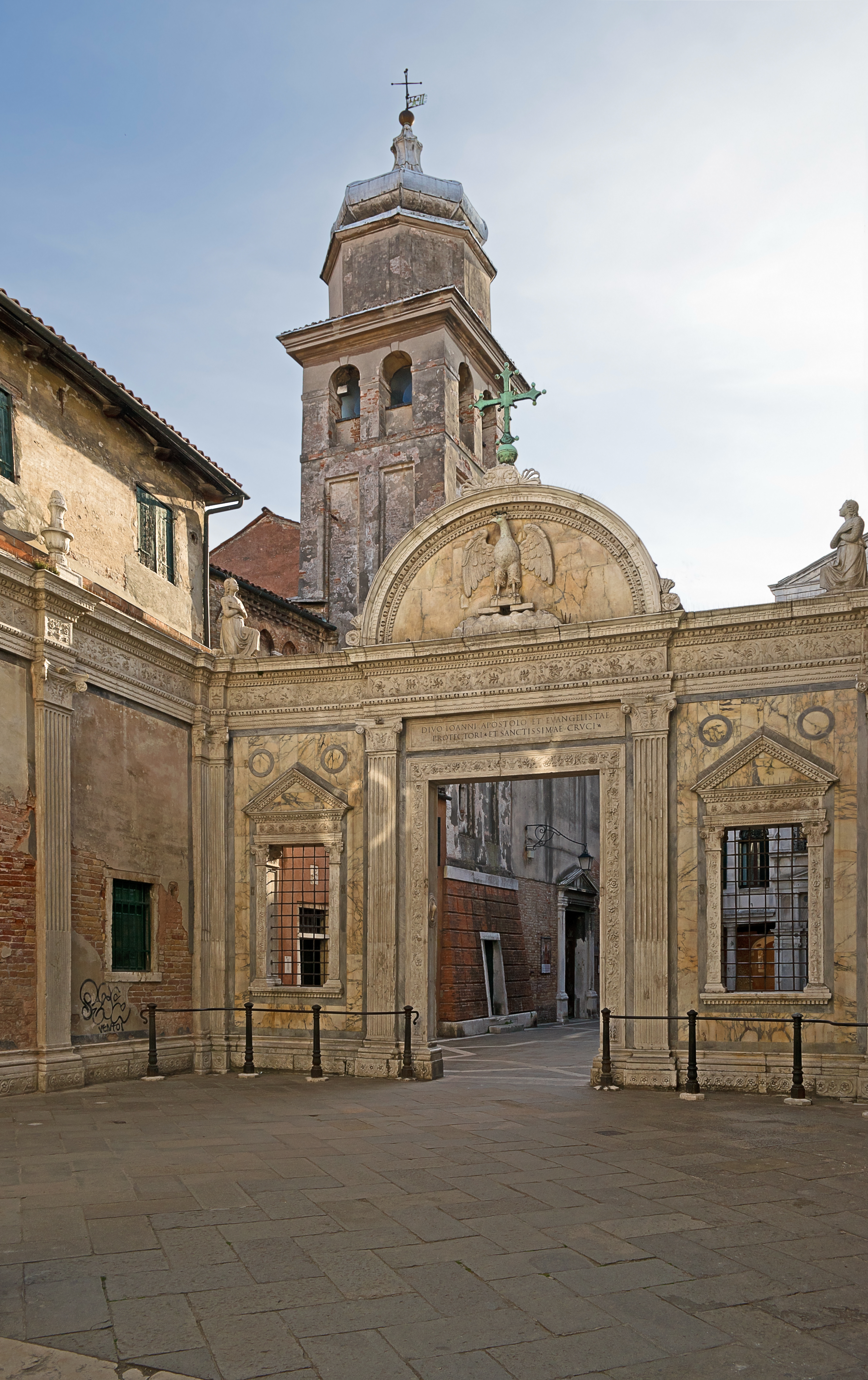
Marble screen by Pietro Lombardo and the church

The Scuola Grande di San Giovanni Evangelista is a confraternity building located in the San Polo sestiere of the Italian city of Venice. Founded in the 13th century by a group of flagellants it was later to become one of the five Scuole Grandi of Venice. The plenary sessions of the Venice Commission take place at the building.

These organisations provided a variety of charitable functions in the city as well as becoming patrons of the arts. The Scuola Grande di San Giovanni Evangelista is notable for housing a relic of the True Cross and for the series of paintings it commissioned from a number of famous Venetian artists depicting Miracles of the Holy Cross. No longer in the school, these came into public ownership during the Napoleonic era and are now housed in the Gallerie dell'Accademia. The Scuola is open to visitors on most days, with occasional closures for events. The official website lists the opening days and any exceptions.

== History ==
Founded in 1261, San Giovanni Evangelista is the second oldest scuola in Venice. Though scuola developed a primary meaning of "school", in Venice these organisations retain their medieval Latin meaning of confraternities, social organisations founded on spiritual principles. Their main buildings were typically used as meeting and assembly halls, and for the distribution of charity. The founders of San Giovanni were a confraternity of flagellants who took part in religious ceremonies, whipping their backs and spraying blood onto the pavements as they processed through the city. This practice was outlawed in the city of Venice in the same year the scuola was founded.

In 1369, Philippe de Mezières (also known as Filippo Maser), the Chancellor of the Kingdom of Jerusalem and the Kingdom of Cyprus, gave to the school a piece of the True Cross which it still owns to this day. The presence of this relic brought about a transformation and helped the scuola become a rich and powerful organisation, bringing in wealthy and powerful members to the confraternity, with their donations and bequests.

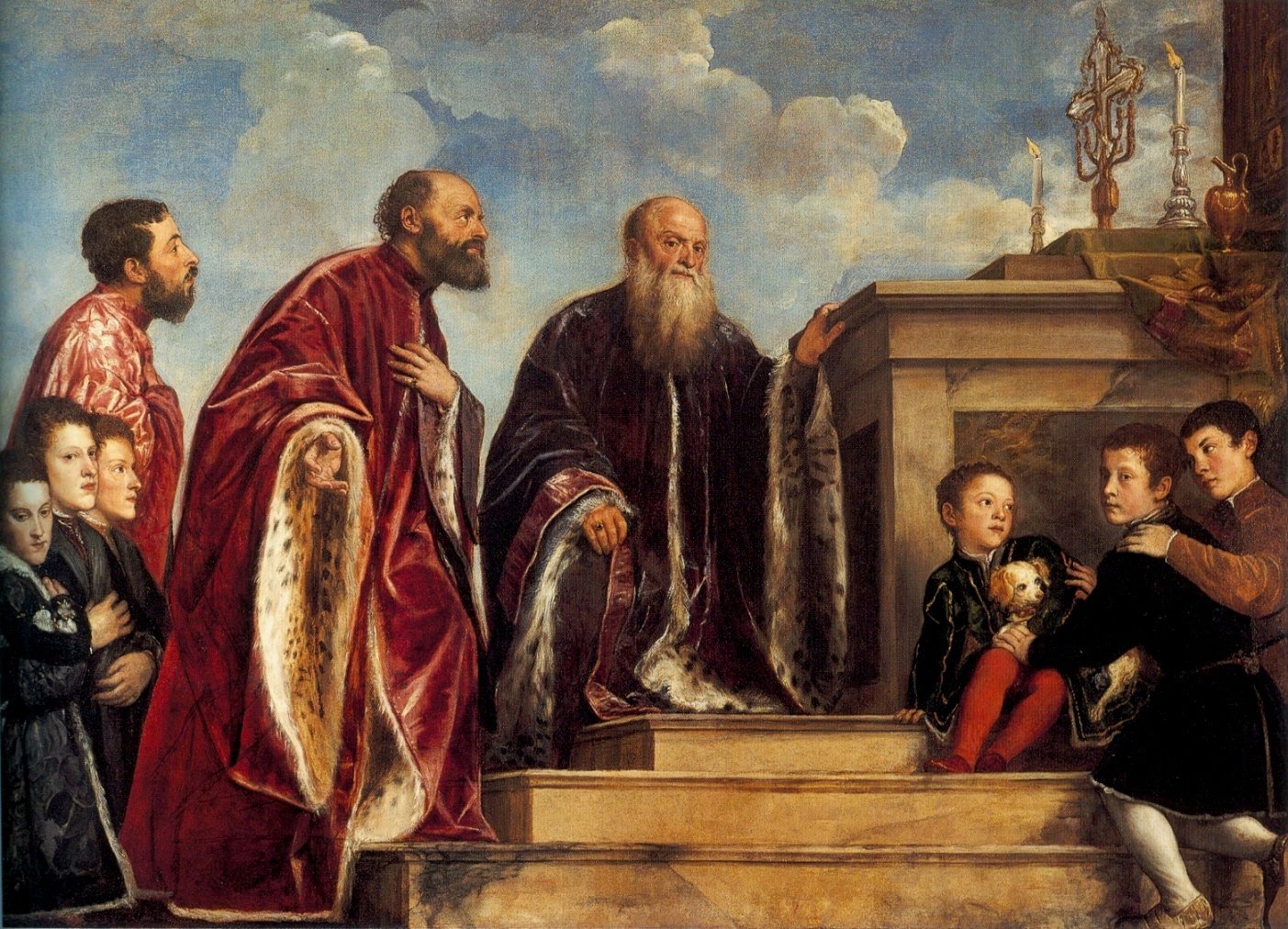
Members of the Vendramin Family Venerating a Relic of the True Cross, Titian and workshop, mid-1540s, showing the reliquary still owned by the scuola

A reliquary was constructed to house the relic and this was soon after connected with a miracle that reportedly took place in Venice during the period 1370-82. According to contemporary accounts, when accidentally dropped into a canal during a congested procession the relic did not sink but hovered over the water, evading those trying to save it. This continued until Andrea Vendramin (grandfather of the only Vendramin doge, also named Andrea) dived in and retrieved it. This was the same Andrea who, as head of the scuola, had been presented with the relic in 1369. This miracle was later depicted by Vittorio Carpaccio, Gentile Bellini and other artists in a series of paintings commissioned for the scuola. Nearly 200 years later the reliquary was the focal point of the Vendramin family portrait by Titian, now in the National Gallery, London, showing the prestige the events had given to the family.

During the Renaissance period the scuola was made into a Scuola Grande under the control of Venice's Council of Ten.

In 1485 the architect Pietro Lombardo completed the school's most distinctive architectural feature, the outdoor atrium and gateway which separate the complex from the campo to which it adjoins. Shortly after, in 1498, the architect Mauro Codussi completed work on a double staircase linking the upper and lower halls. It is illuminated by a mullioned window on the landing between the two flights of stairs, an element common to much of Codussi's work.

The final major architectural changes were made during the 18th century. Following the fall of the Venetian Republic in 1797 the schools were suppressed by a Napoleonic edict. However, during the 19th century San Giovanni Evangelista was one of the ones re-constituted.

== Exterior ==
The school is defined externally by the open air atrium or courtyard, separated from the city by a marble screen of (1478–1481) by Pietro Lombardo. Though appearing harmonious the courtyard is the work of several different periods. The facade of the main scuola dates from the 1450s but incorporates two small reliefs from 1349. Lombardo's Renaissance screen comprises Corinthian pillars, a semi-circular pediment with St John's eagle and a frieze carved with foliage. This gateway was, until the school's dissolution, barred by double doors. The main door to the scuola was added in 1512 and features a lintel with kneeling figures. Opposite the buildings of the scuola stands the scuola's small church also dedicated to St. John the Evangelist.

The atrium building is two stories high while behind this is the much larger three-story building which contains the large halls.

== Interior ==
The confraternity building has a number of rooms. On the ground floor there is a large hall, known as Sala delle Colonne ("Hall of Columns"). This was intended as a place where brothers and pilgrims could gather and is part of the original 14th-century building. Today it is often used for exhibitions. There are two smaller rooms on the lower floor. These are the Sala Verde (the Green Room, a former warehouse and office) and the Sala Azzurra (the Blue Room, also used for administration).

The upper floor is reached by Codussi's Scalone Monumentale (Great Staircase). Lit by round-headed windows it is domed and vaulted. The stairs lead to a large upper room, the Salone, which was redecorated by Giorgio Massari in 1727. Beyond the Salone is the Oratory of the Cross where a piece of true cross is housed within a Gothic reliquary. Beyond the Oratory is the Sala Dell'Albergo which hosted the government meetings of the School.

== Works of art ==
=== Painting cycle of the Miracles of the True Cross ===
A number of Italian Renaissance artists, including Pietro Perugino, Vittore Carpaccio, Gentile Bellini, Giovanni Mansueti and Lazzaro Bastiani, were commissioned to paint a number of canvasses for the Oratory of the Cross. Each one showed episodes of the story of the Relic of the True Cross. Following the Napoleonic suppression these became government property and in 1820 were moved to the Gallerie dell'Accademia where they can be seen today.

The canvas painted by Perugino has been lost, but the eight surviving paintings were created between 1496 and 1501 (except the one by Benedetto Rusconi), contain depictions of some of the most famous parts of Venice and a story:

1. Lazzaro Bastiani, Offering of the Relic of the Cross to the Brothers of the Scuola Grande di San Giovanni Evangelista (c. 1496)
2. Vittore Carpaccio, Miracle of the Relic of the Cross at the Ponte di Rialto (c. 1496)
3. Gentile Bellini, Miracle of the Cross at the Bridge of S. Lorenzo (1500)
4. Gentile Bellini, Procession in St. Mark's Square (c. 1496)
5. Gentile Bellini, Miraculous Healing of Pietro de’ Ludovici (1501)
6. Giovanni Mansueti, Miracle of the Relic of the Holy Cross in Campo San Lio (c. 1496)
7. Giovanni Mansueti, The Miraculous Healing of the Daughter of Benvegnudo of San Polo (c. 1501)
8. Benedetto Rusconi, Miracle of the Relic of the Holy Cross (c. 1505-1510)

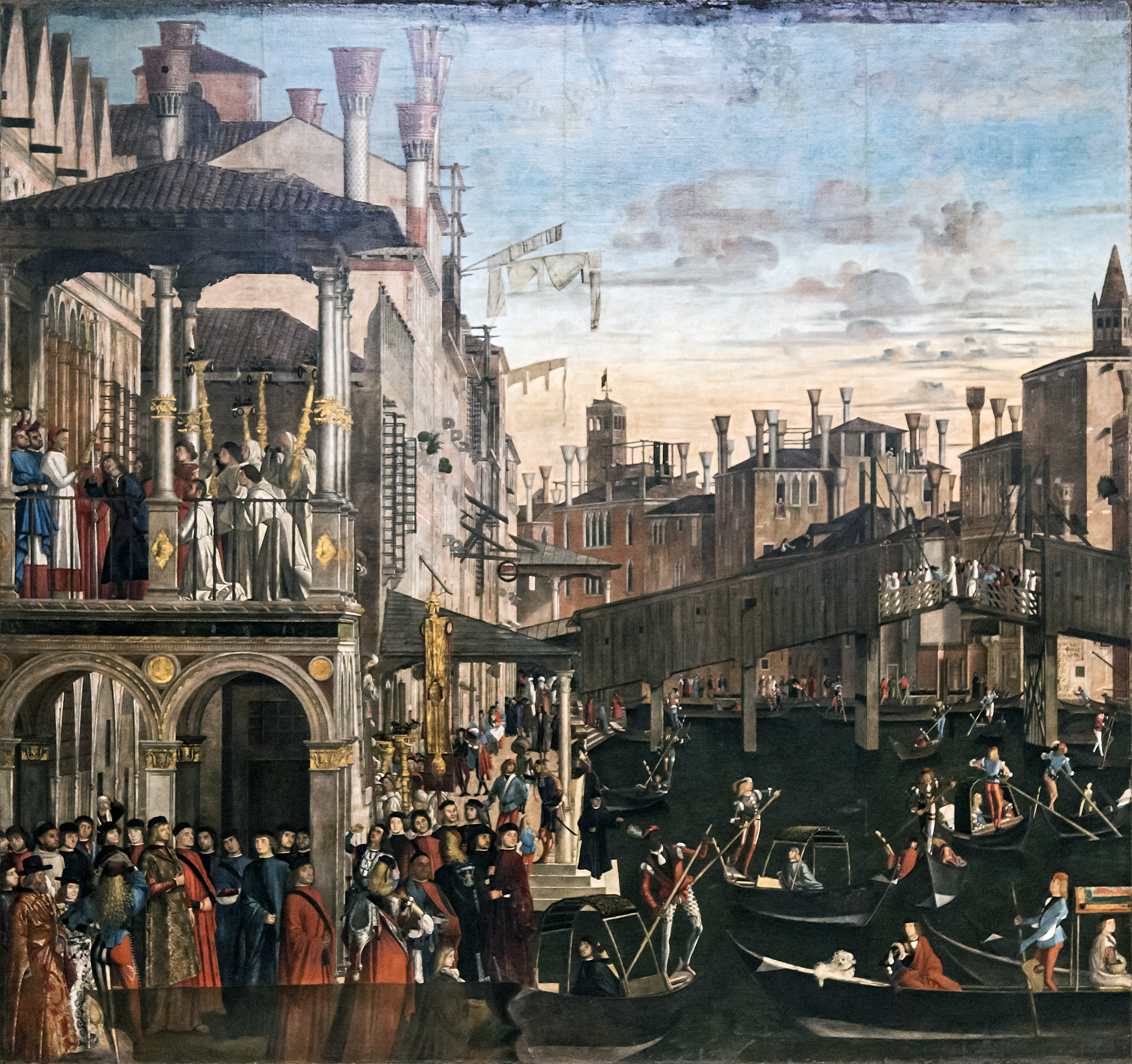
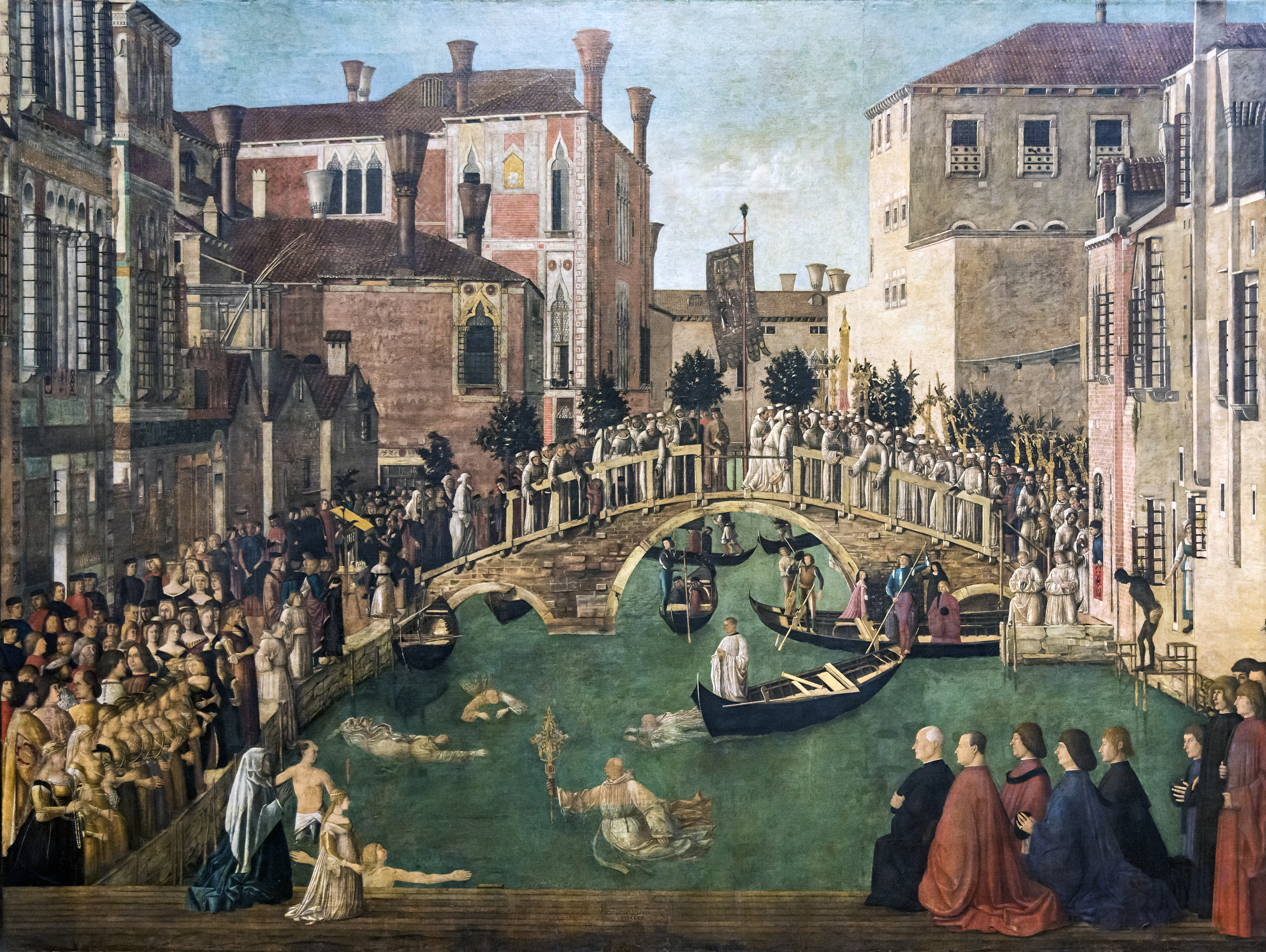
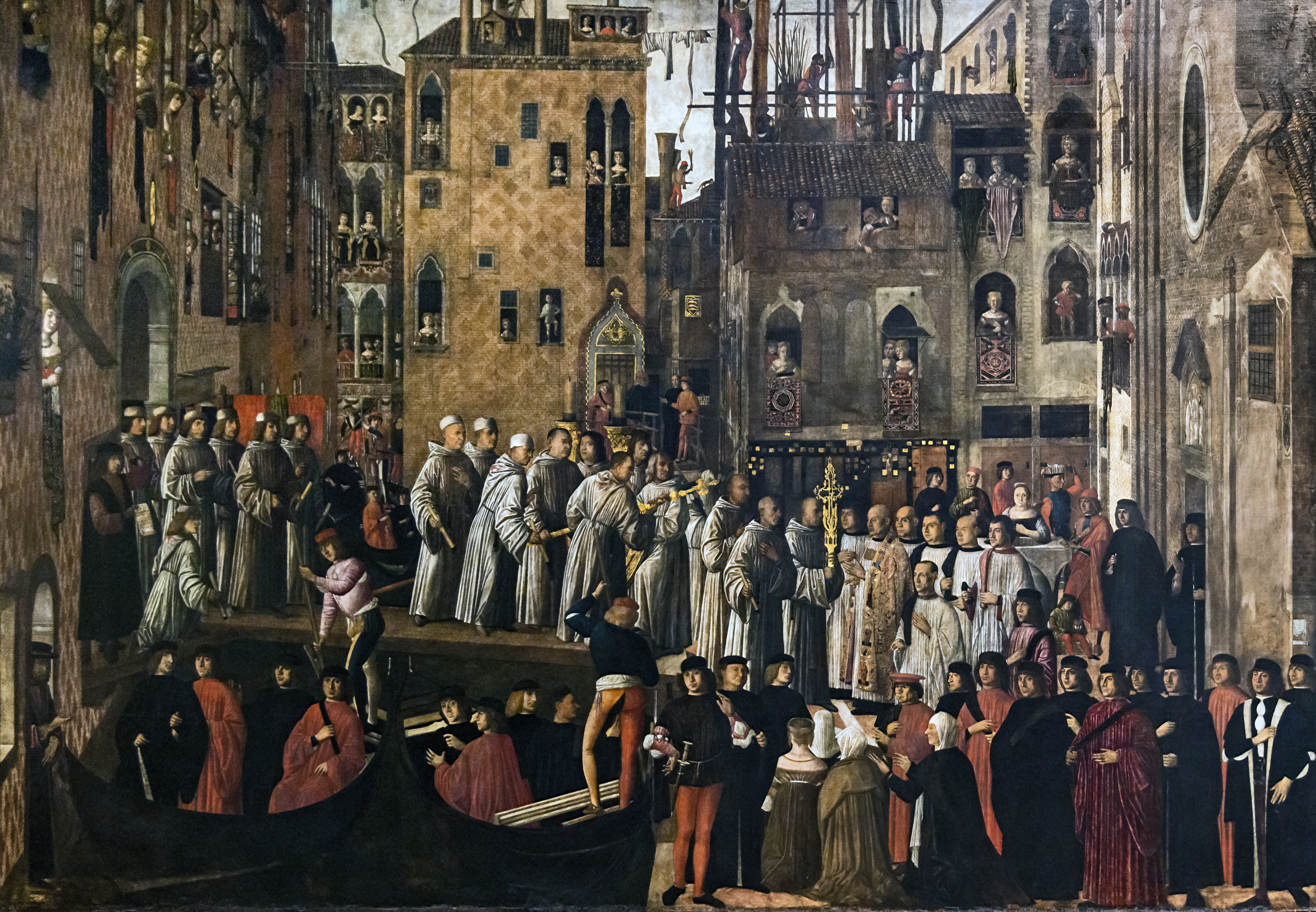

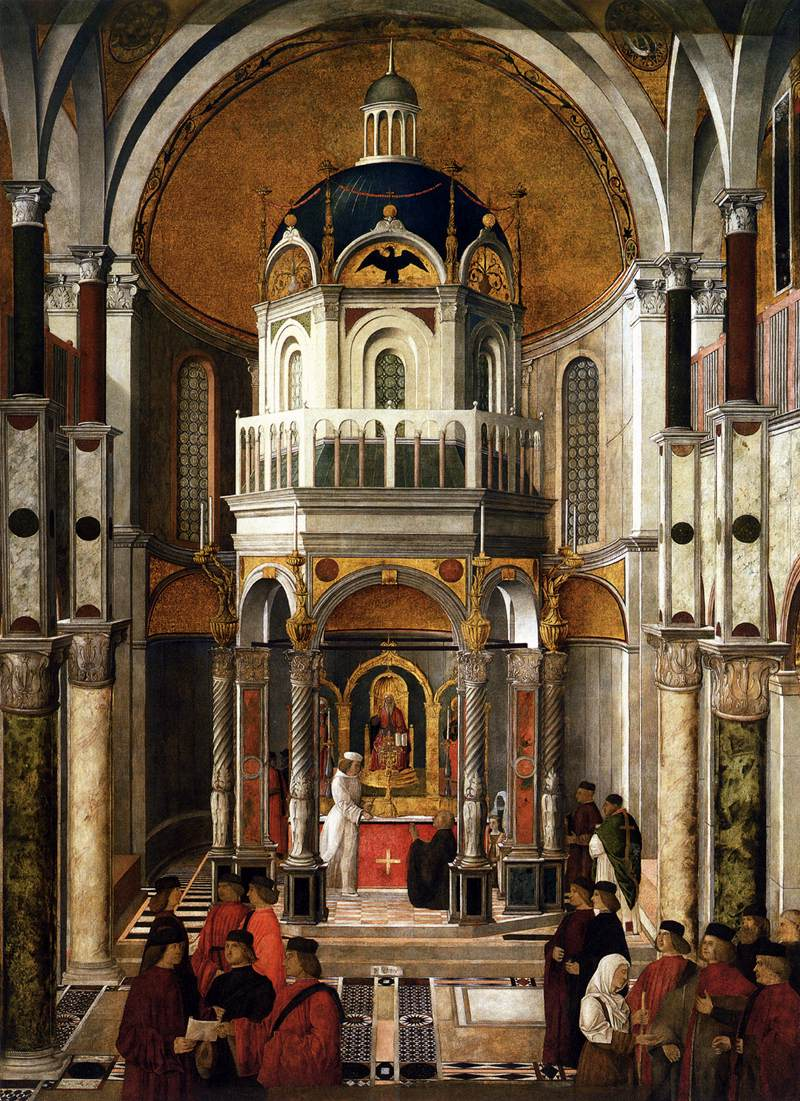
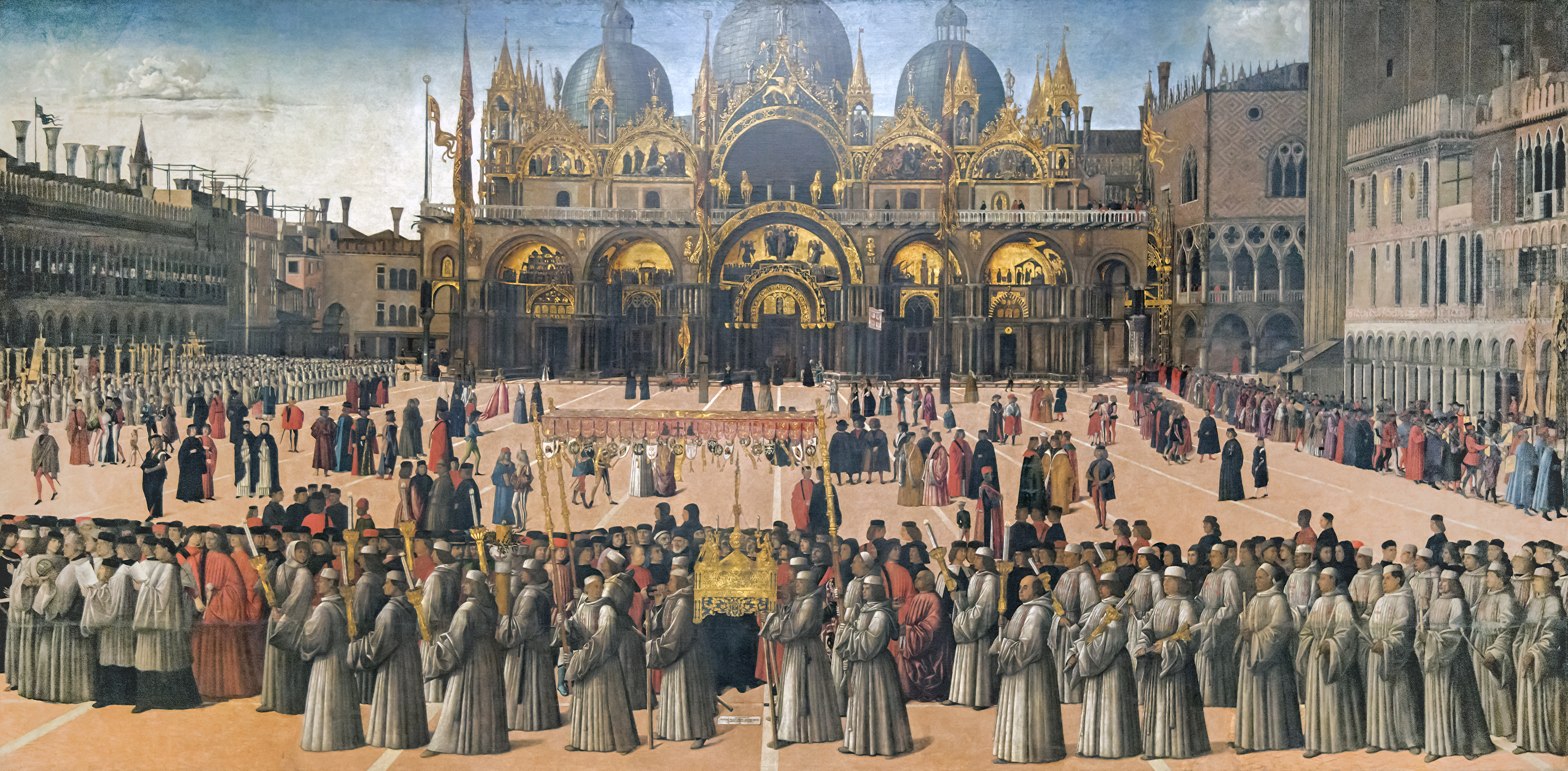
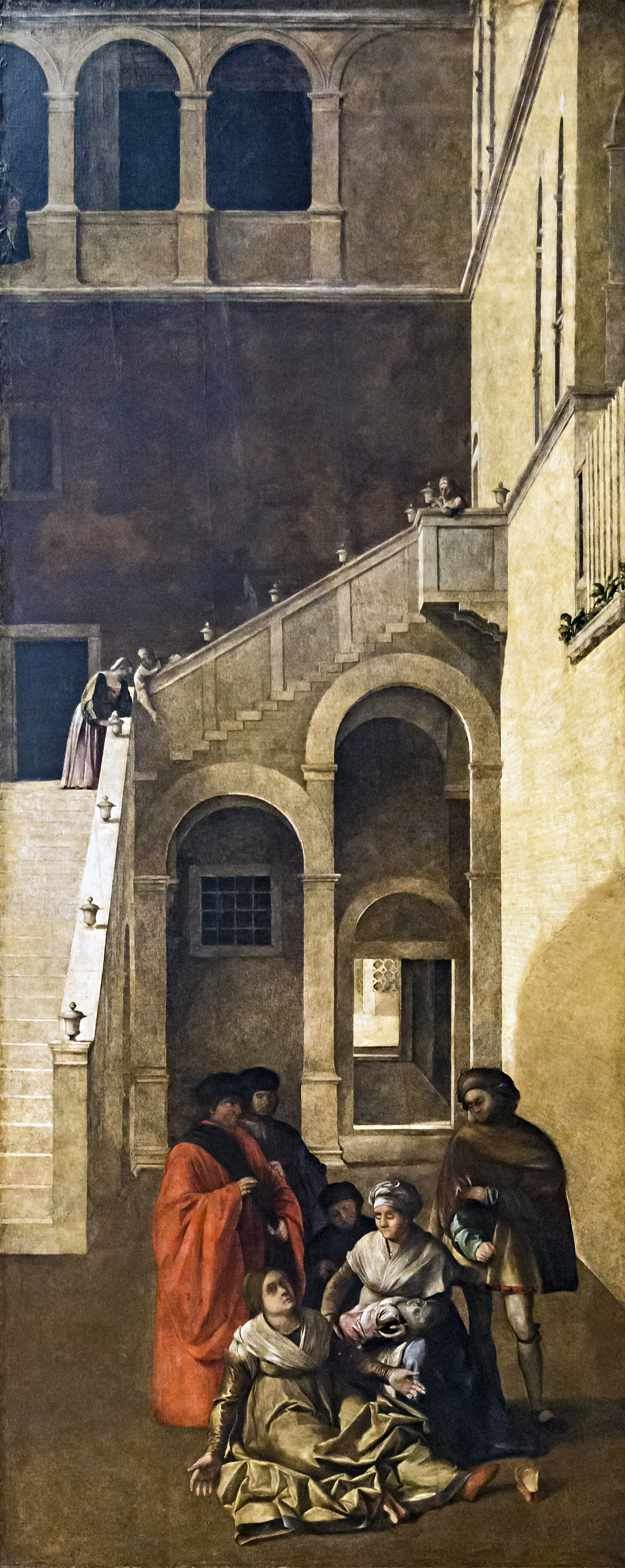

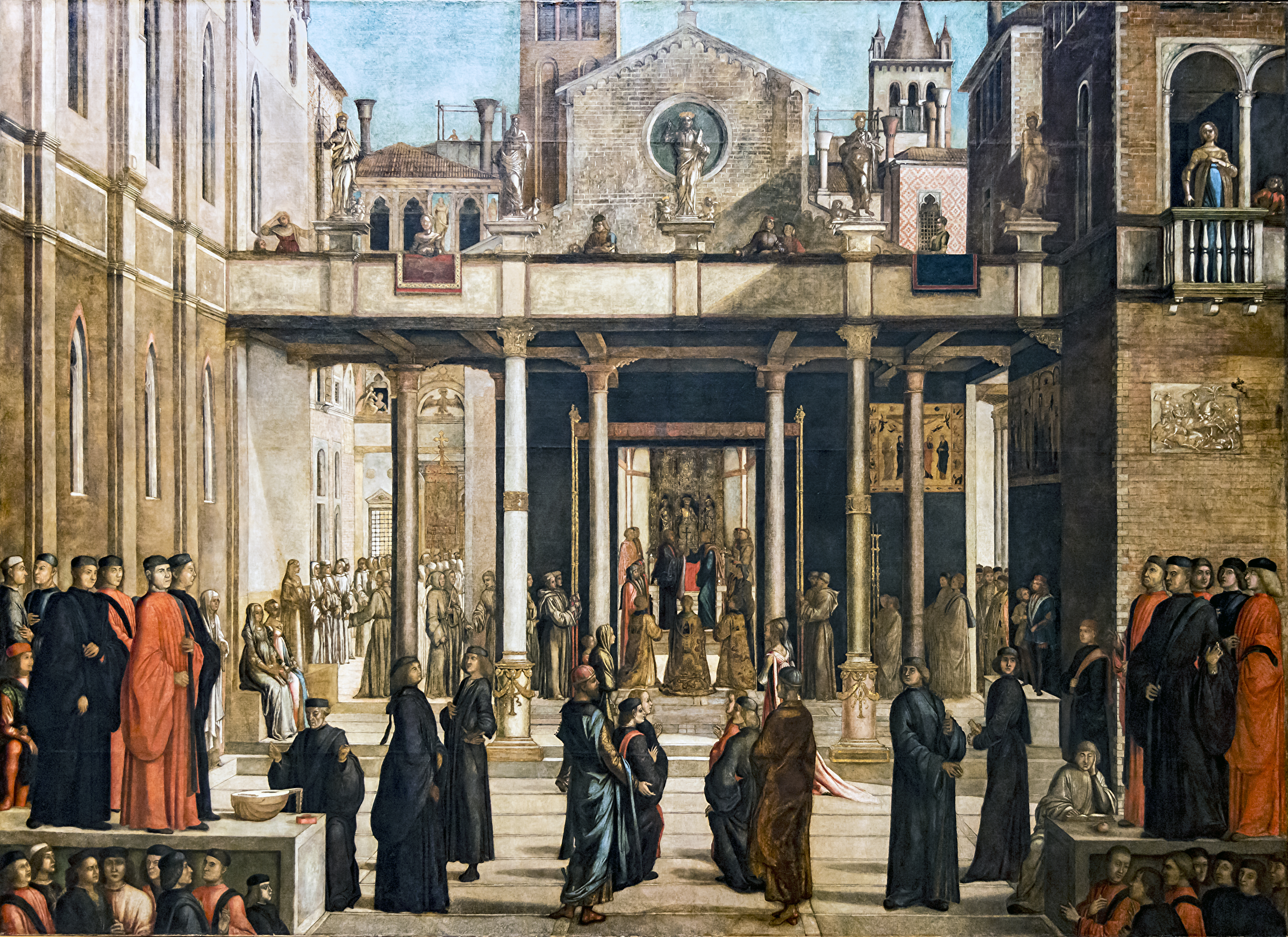
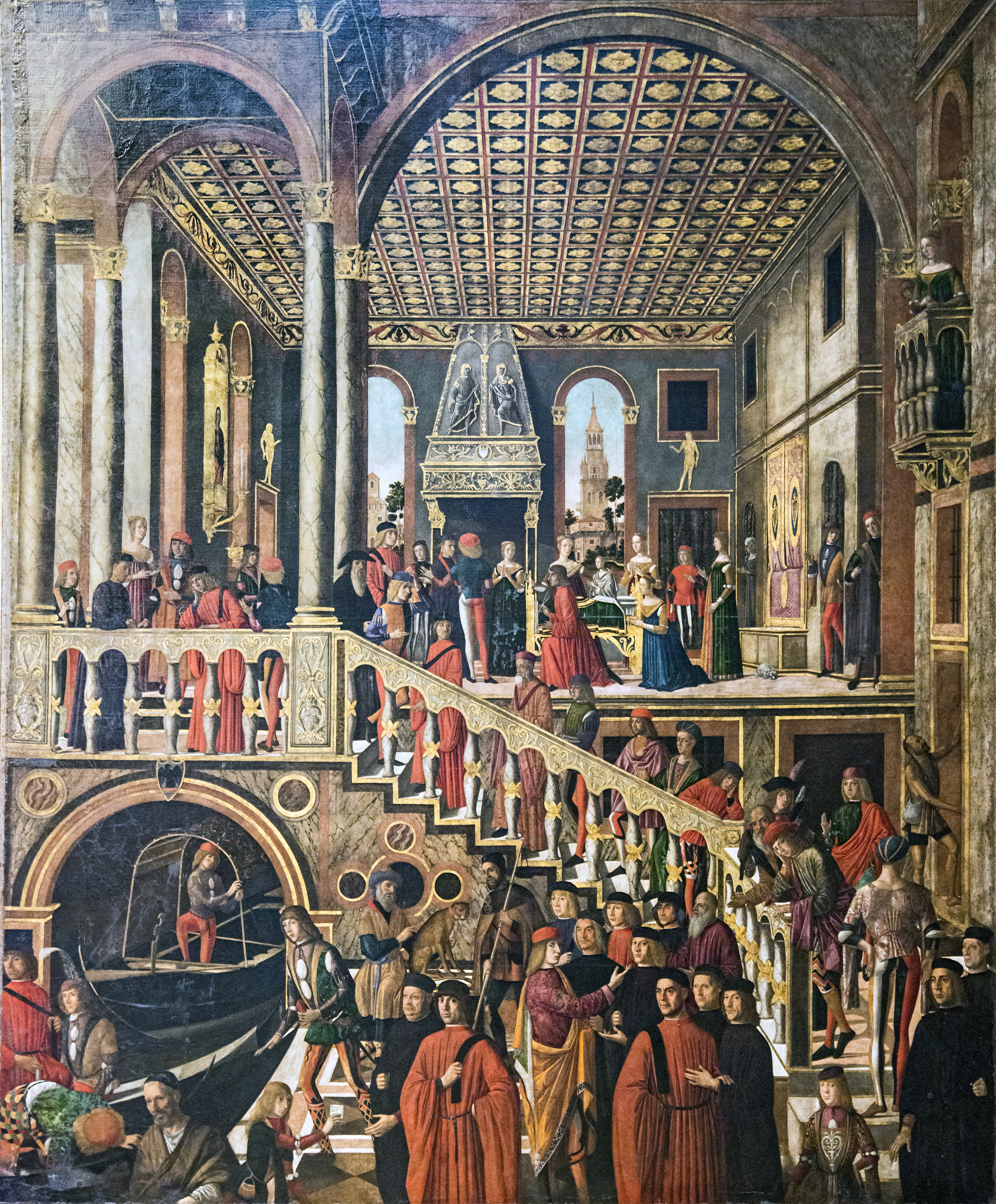

Though many paintings have been moved to other locations the school still houses some original artwork including Domenico Tintoretto's The Crucifixion, signed and dated 1626. The Salone contains visions of the Apocalypse by Tiepolo.

== See also ==
- The Vendramin Family of Venice

== Sources ==
- Honour, Hugh (1983). The companion guide to Venice. Englewood Cliffs, N.J.: Prentice-Hall. ISBN 0-13-154666-X.
- McGregor, James Harvey (2006). Venice from the ground up. Cambridge, Mass.: Belknap Press of Harvard University Press. ISBN 0-674-02333-1.
- Gould, Cecil (1975). The Sixteenth Century Italian Schools. London: National Gallery Catalogues. ISBN 0-947645-22-5.
