= Giovanni Agostino Perotti =

Italian composer, conductor, teacher, and writer

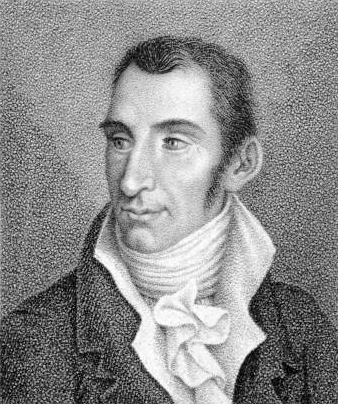
Giovanni Agostino Perotti by Luigi Rados.

Giovanni Agostino Perotti (12 April 1769 in Vercelli – 6 June 1855 in Venice) was an Italian composer, conductor, teacher and writer.

== Life ==
Perotti studied music with his brother Giovanni Domenico and later in Bologna with Stanislao Mattei. In 1795 he was in Vienna as a keyboard player and in 1798 he moved to London.

He returned in Italy in 1801 and settled in Venice where in 1811 he was appointed maestro in the Cappella Marciana, position that he held till the death in 1855.

Perotti was essentially a composer of sacred music.

== Compositions ==
=== Sacred music ===
- Abele (orat, P. Metastasio), Bologna, 1794
- La contadina nobile (comic op), Pisa, 1795, lost
- Exultate Deo, 4vv, org (Venice, n.d.);
- 125 sacred works for soloists, chorus and orch, including masses, mass sections, canticles, hymns, Lamentations, motets, ps settings, vespers (in I-Vsm, Vlevi)
- other sacred works and fugues (in D-Dlb)
- Mass, in collaboration with Pacini (in I-Li)
- 16 fugues, Bc

=== Piano ===
- Sonata, 6 hands
- Concerto, 4 hands
- 6 sonate, 4 hands
- Sonata, 4 hands
- Theme and Variations, 2, 4 hands
- 4 sonatas
- Variations on Diletta immagine
- other pieces
