= Cristoforo Ivanovich =

Venetian opera historian

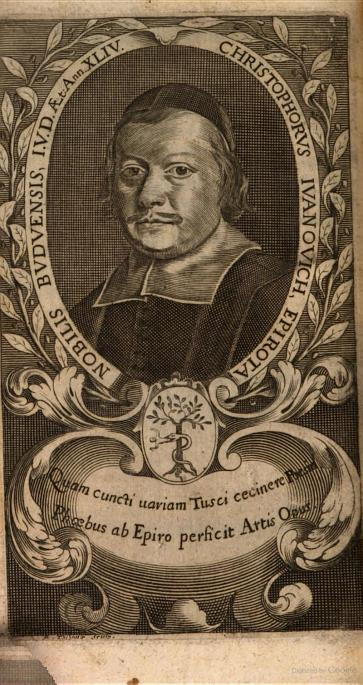
- Cristoforo Ivanovich, from Minerva al tavolino, 1680
- Born: 1620; Budua, Venetian Albania
- Died: 6 January 1689 (aged 68–69); Venice, Most Serene Republic of Venice
- Occupations: Historian, opera composer

Cristoforo Ivanovich (Serbian: Kristofor Ivanović; 1628–6 January 1689) was the first historian of Venetian opera, who also wrote several librettos of his own.

== Biography ==
Ivanovich was born in Budua (Budva), at the time part of Venetian Albania (now southeastern Montenegro). According to his testimony, he descended from an old patrician family who settled in Budva after leaving Cetinje. In 1655, he moved to Verona, where he was a member of the Accademia Filarmonica and of the Accademia dei Temperati. In 1657, he moved to Venice, the city where he remained throughout his life. There he became secretary of Leonardo Pesaro, Procurator of San Marco, and later, in 1676, was appointed canon of St Mark's Basilica. From 1663, he wrote several librettos for operas which were performed in the theatres of Venice, Vienna and Piacenza. He catalogued all opera performances held in Venice from 1637 until 1681 in his treatise Memorie teatrali di Venzia (Theatrical Memories of Venice), published in 1680 as part of the collection Minerva al tavolino. He wrote all his works in Italian and nearly all of his librettos are drammi per musica.

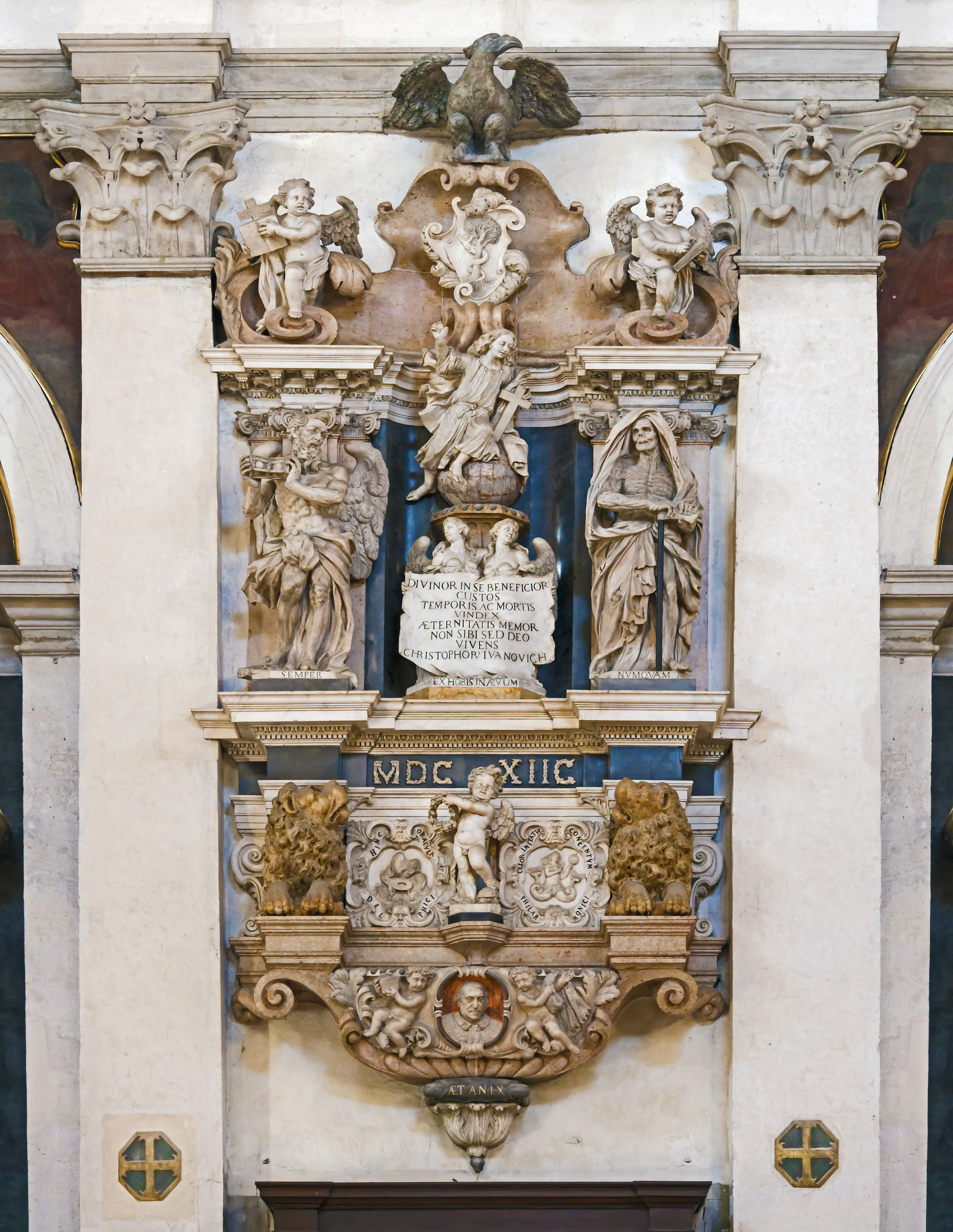
Funerary monument of Cristoforo Ivanovich by Marco Beltrame

== Notable works ==
- L'amor guerriero (music by Pietro Andrea Ziani, 1663)
- La Circe (music by Pietro Andrea Ziani, 1665), music by Domenico Freschi, 1679)
- Coriolano (music by Francesco Cavalli, 1669)
- La costanza trionfrante (music by Gian Domenico Partenio, 1673, music by Bernardo Pasquini as Dov'è amore è pietà, 1679)
- Lisimaco (music by Giovanni Maria Pagliardi, 1673)
- L'africano trionfo di Pompeo (1678)
- La felicità regnante (serenata, 1681)
- Ivanovich, Cristoforo (27 February 1680). Minerva al tavolino (in Italian and Latin). – Letters, essays, poetry, incl. Memorie teatrali di Venzia (pp. 361 ff)

== Bibliography ==
- Ivano Cavallini: "Questioni di poetica del melodramma del Seicento nelle lettere di Cristoforo Ivanovich", in Giovanni Legrenzi e la Cappella ducale di San Marco, pp. 185–99 (Venice, 1990)
- Norbert Dubowy: Introduction to C. Ivanovich: Memorie teatrali di Venezia (Lucca, 1993)
- Miloš Milošević: "Il contributo di Cristoforo Ivanovich nell'evoluzione del melodramma seicentesco", in Il libro nel bacino adriatico (secc. XVI–XVIII)], pp. 111–24 (Venice, 1989)
- Miloš Velimirović. Cristoforo Ivanovich from Budva: the First Historian of the Venetian Opera (1967)
- Thomas Walker. "Gli errori di Minerva al tavolino: osservazioni sulla cronologia delle prime opere veneziane", in Venezia e il melodramma nel Seicento, pp. 7–20 (Venice, 1972)
- Anna Laura Bellina (2000). "Brevità, frequenza e varietà: Cristoforo Ivanovich librettista e storico dell'opera veneziana". Musica e storia. VIII: 367–390.
