= Delfino Thermignon =

Italian composer, conductor, and teacher

Delfino Thermignon (Turin May 26, 1861 – Narzole May 30, 1944) was an Italian composer, conductor, and teacher.

== Life ==
He studied with Carlo Pedrotti, Carlo Fassò and Lorenzo Bellardi at the Liceo Musicale of Turin, After the diploma in 1883 Thermignon moved to Regensburg to complete his studies with Franz Xaver Haberl, at the Kirchenmusikschule that Haberl had founded in 1874. A noted musician and musicologist, Haberl was the pioneering editor of the complete works of Palestrina and Lassus. At the same Liceo Musicale later he taught musical theory (1882–89), choral singing (1886–93) and singing (1889-1900). In the ten years from 1890 to 1900 he was director of the Accademia di canto corale Stefano Tempia di Turin.

In 1900 Thermignon was appointed Maestro of the Cappella Marciana at San Marco's Basilica in Venice as successor of Lorenzo Perosi, position that he held till 1921. Back to Turin he was teacher at the Liceo Musicale till 1932.

He died in Narzole in 1944.

== Compositions ==
- Un'Astuzia d'amore, opera (1890)
- L'Assedio di Canelli, opera (1894)
- San Marco, oratorio (1908)
- L'Annunciazione di Maria Vergine (1911)
- Missa Te Rogamus Domine, a 3 voices
- Missa pro defunctis secunda
- masses, motets and several choral pieces including Audi benigne Conditor

== Writings ==
- Teoria elementare e regole musicali
- Manuale di musica ad uso delle Scuole e Società corali

== Sources ==
- De Angelis, Alberto: L'Italia musicale d'oggi, dizionario dei musicisti (1918)
