= Umberto Ravetta =

Italian bishop and choir conductor

- Bishop of Senigallia
- Church: Catholic Church
- Diocese: Diocese of Senigallia
- In office: 14 November 1938 – 20 January 1965
- Predecessor: Tito Maria Cucchi
- Successor: Odo Fusi Pecci

Orders
- Ordination: 25 July 1909
- Consecration: 21 December 1938 by Adeodato Giovanni Piazza

Personal details
- Born: 22 December 1884 Venice, Province of Venice, Kingdom of Italy
- Died: 20 January 1965 (aged 80) Senigallia, Province of Ancona, Italy

Umberto Ravetta (Venice, 22 December 1884 – Senigallia, 26 January 1965) was an Italian bishop and choir conductor.

== Life ==
Born in Venice, Ravetta was ordained as a priest on 25 July 1909 by cardinal Aristide Cavallari. He was a good musician and he led the Cappella Marciana from 1921 to 1926. He was elected bishop of Senigallia on 14 November 1938. He attended the first two sessions of the Second Vatican Council until his death on 26 January 1965.

== Compositions ==
- Ave Maris Stella
