= Francesco Usper =

Italian composer and organist

Francesco Usper (real name Spongia or Sponga) (1 November 1561 – 24 February 1641), was an Italian composer and organist born in Rovigno, Istria (now Rovinj, Croatia). He settled in Venice before 1586 and is associated with the confraternity St. Giovanni Evangelista, Venice. He spent most of his life there, serving as organist, chaplain, manager of the adjoining church (the S. Salvador) and administrative officer. Usper studied under Andrea Gabrieli and apparently became a fairly well known composer; he collaborated in the writing of a Requiem mass (now lost) with Giovanni Battista Grillo and Claudio Monteverdi for the Grand Duke Cosimo II, and he served as substitute organist at St. Mark's in 1622 and 1623. Although his music tended towards conservatism, he shows his ability to handle with skill sensitivity to the instrumental styles just emerging in the early 17th century.
