= Marco Beltrame =

Italian sculptor

Marco Beltrame (17th century) was an Italian sculptor of the Baroque period, active mainly in his birthplace, Venice.

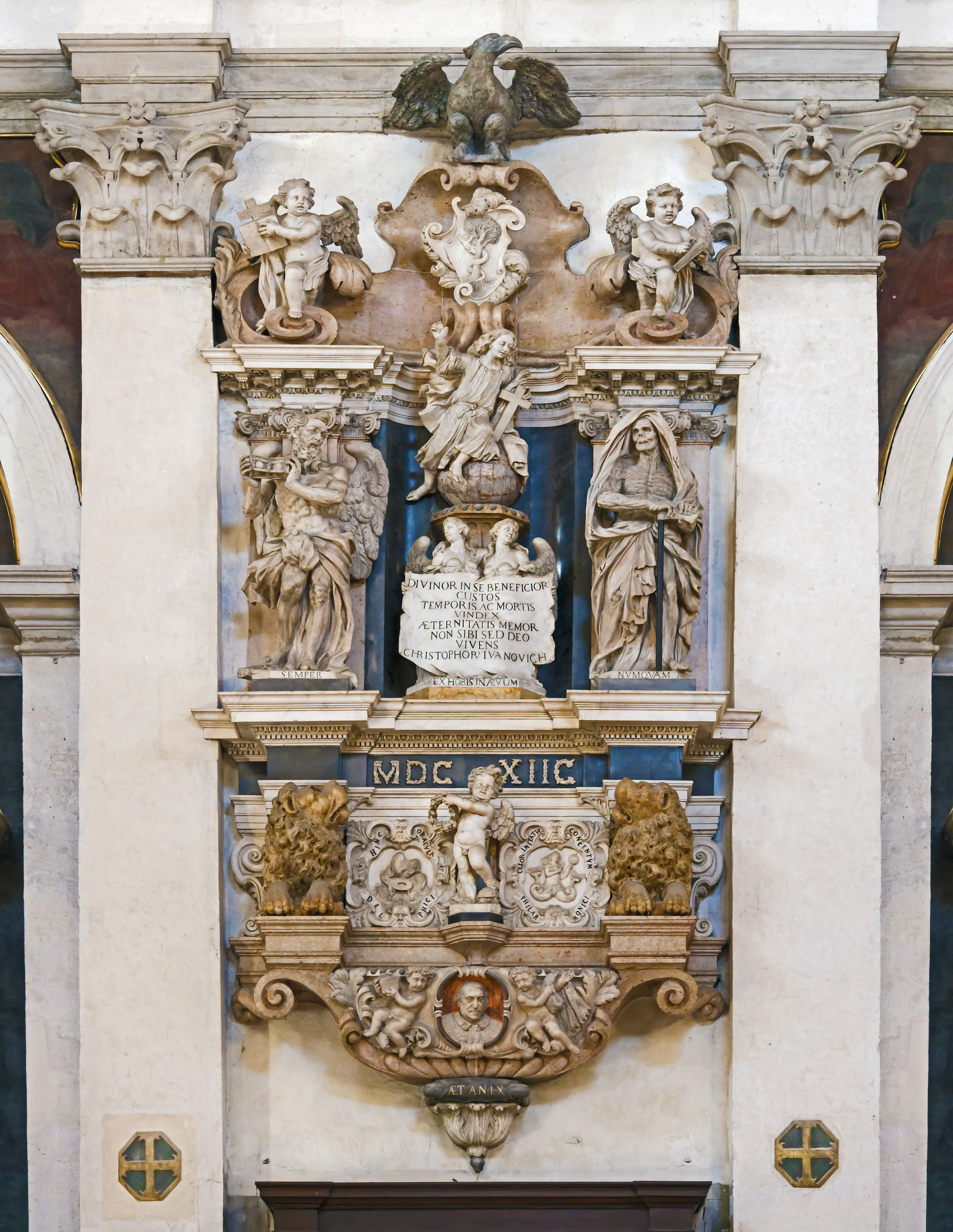
Funerary monument of Cristoforo Ivanovich

== Bibliography ==
- Ticozzi, Stefano (1830). Dizionario degli architetti, scultori, pittori, intagliatori in rame ed in pietra, coniatori di medaglie, musaicisti, niellatori, intarsiatori d'ogni etá e d'ogni nazione' (Volume 1). Milan: Gaetano Schiepatti. p. 139.
