= Giuseppe Sala (music publisher) =

Giuseppe Sala (c.1643 — February 1, 1727) was an Italian music publisher, printer, and bookseller in Venice, Italy. A member of the Venetian Guild of Printers, he began his printing business in 1676 through the financial backing of composer Natale Monferrato. He was active as a printer through 1716, during which time he published more than 151 works; including several large anthologies of music. Some of the composers whose music he published included Tomaso Albinoni, Giovanni Battista Bassani, Francesco Maria Benedetti, Ercole Bernabei, Giovanni Maria Bononcini, Francesco Antonio Bonporti, Antonio Caldara, Maurizio Cazzati, Arcangelo Corelli, Francesco Gasparini, Giovanni Lorenzo Gregori, Giovanni Legrenzi, Antonio Sartorio, Giulio Taglietti, and Giovanni Battista Vitali.
