= Antonio Molino =

Venetian actor

Antonio Molino (c. 1496 – c. 1572), called Burchiella, was a Venetian actor, musician and poet of the Renaissance.

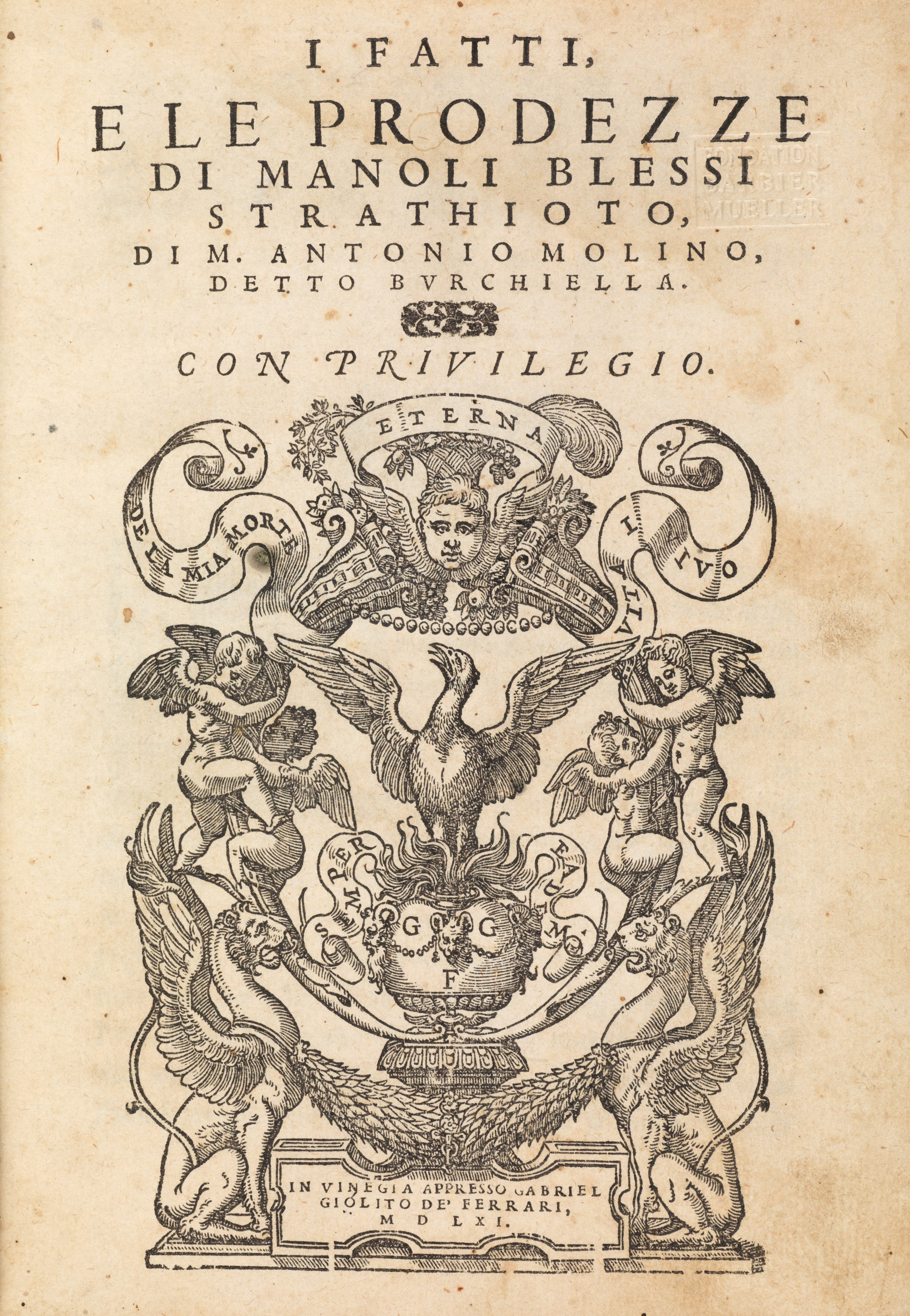
Frontispiece of I fatti, Molino's most famous work

== Life ==
The date and place of Molino's birth are unknown. Since he claimed to be over seventy years old in 1568, he was probably born between 1495 and 1497. Documentary evidence for his life is almost nonexistent. The most important source is his personal friend, Lodovico Dolce, who wrote introductions to his works. According to Dolce, Molino was a citizen of Venice in 1561. He is also listed as one of the twelve conservators of the Accademia degli Uniti (founded 1551), whose membership was limited to the Venetian nobility.

Dolce records that Molino received a typical nobleman's education in dance and song, learning to play the viol and lute. He traveled to Corfu and Crete as a merchant, where he encountered the Greek language. He may have been in Corfu in 1526–1527. Upon his return to Venice, he founded a musical academy with the organist Giovanni Armonio Marso, but barely a trace of its activities survives.

Molino was a leading figure in the new commedia dell'arte. He was one of the first actors to perform comedies in the Venetian and Bergamasque dialects, in greghesco (a pidgin of his own creation, inspired by that of the Greek community in Venice) and in stil strathiotesco (soldiers' jargon). He was an associate of Andrea Gabrieli, Vincenzo Bellaver, Claudio Merulo, Cipriano de Rore and Adrian Willaert. In 1570, Gabrieli's Second Book of Madrigals and Philippe de Monte's Third Book of Madrigals were dedicated to him.

Molino's nickname, Burchiella, is a play on the nickname of the 14th-century poet Burchiello and a name for a small fishing boat, connecting him to the comic fishermen of Andrea Calmo's verse. Molino died in Venice in or after 1571.

== Works ==
A madrigal by Molino, Perché, Madonna, io vivo sol di vostro amore, is included in the Primo libro dei madrigale of Costanzo Festa (1538). Molino later published two books of madrigals, I dilettevoli madrigali a quattro voci (1568) and Il secondo libro de madrigali a quattro voci con uno dialogo (1569).

In 1561, Molino published a lengthy comic poem in eight cantos, I fatti e le prodezze di Manoli Blessi strathioto, dedicated to Giacomo Contarini. Written in Venetian with some greghesco, it is about the fiction Greek soldier Manoli Blessi. In 1564, musical settings of his poetry in greghesco were published in Il primo libro delle greghesche, with contributions from Gabrieli, Merulo, Rore, Willaert and Annibale Padovano.

In 1572, Molino published sonnets under the name Manoli Blessi. Fifteen of his poems are set to music in Gabrieli's Greghesche et iustiniane (1571). The poem Pianto et lamento de Selin, Drian imperador de Turchi (1571) has been tentatively assigned to Molino. He certainly wrote several anti-Turkish works under the name Manoli Blessi at the time of the Ottoman–Venetian War (1570–1573). These include Sopra la presa de Margaritin con un Dialogo piacevole di un greco, et di un fachino (1571), dedicated to Fabio Canal; Dialogo de Selin, con Giosuf ebreo de Manoli Blessi, et una barzelletta contra Mustafà Bassà (1571); Nella rotta dell’armata de Sultan Selin, ultimo re de turchi (1571); and Il vero successo della presa di Nicosia in Cipro di Manoli Blessi Strathiotto (1572).

== Bibliography ==
- Arnold, Denis (2001). "Greghesca". Grove Music Online (8th ed.). Oxford University Press. ISBN 978-1-56159-263-0. (subscription, Wikilibrary access, or UK public library membership required)
- Crimi, Giuseppe (2011). "Molino, Antonio". Dizionario Biografico degli Italiani (in Italian). Vol. 75: Miranda–Montano. Rome: Istituto dell'Enciclopedia Italiana. ISBN 978-88-12-00032-6.
- Kahane, Henry (1986). "A Typology of the Prestige Language". Language. 62 (4): 495–508. doi:10.1353/lan.1986.0048.
- Warren, Charles (2001). "Molino, Antonio". Grove Music Online (8th ed.). Oxford University Press. ISBN 978-1-56159-263-0. (subscription, Wikilibrary access, or UK public library membership required)
- Zečević, Nada (2019). "Restoration, Reconstruction and Union: Memories of Home in the Stratiot Poetry of Antonio Molino" (PDF). Radovi Zavoda za hrvatsku povijest Filozofskoga fakulteta Sveučilišta u Zagrebu. 51 (1): 163–180. doi:10.17234/RadoviZHP.51.8.
