= Giovanni Armonio Marso =

Italian Renaissance humanist and friar (circa 1477 – circa 1553)

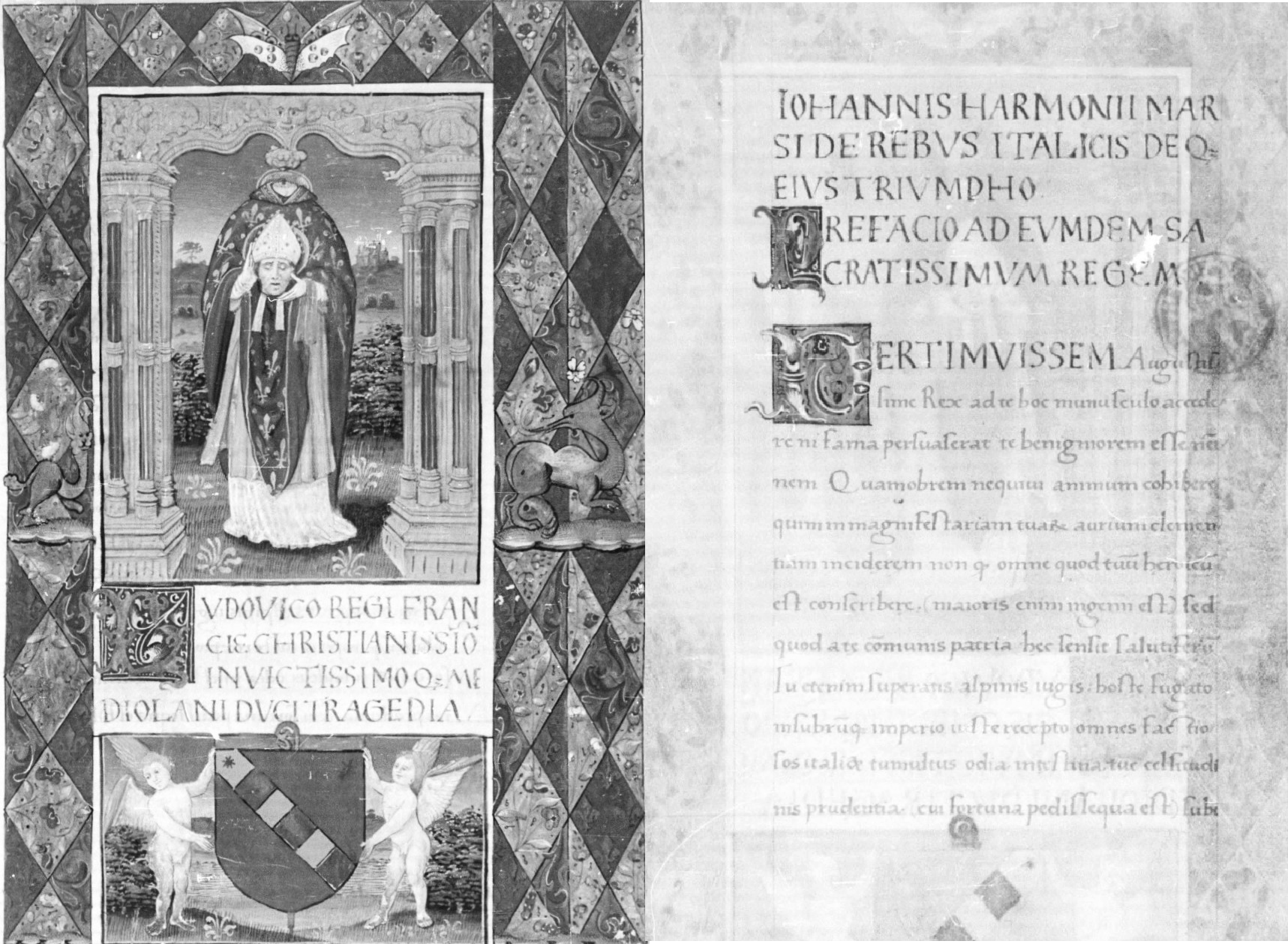
Frontispiece and title page of Marso's tragedy, De rebus Italicis. The frontispiece depicts Saint Denis of Paris, associating the manuscript with the Abbey of Saint-Denis.

Giovanni Armonio Marso (c. 1477 – c. 1553), called Johannes Harmonius Marsus in Latin, was an Italian Renaissance humanist, friar, playwright, poet and organist.

== Life ==
Armonio was born in the Marsica, probably at Tagliacozzo, between 1475 and 1480. His cognomen, Marso, refers to his place of origin. By 1500, he was living in Venice, when Pietro Bembo wrote to Andrea Gabrieli inviting him to bring Armonio to his villa in Padua. He was already then known as a poet. It is not known when he joined the Crutched Friars (Crociferi) or when he joined the Cappella Marciana under Dionisio Memmo. He was living in the church of Santa Maria Assunta dei Crociferi at least from 1506.

In 1516, Armonio became the first or second organist of the cappella. In 1530, his stipend was raised from sixty to eighty ducats. Including Christmas and Easter bonuses, he would have made one hundred twenty ducats a year. According to Anton Francesco Doni, he founded a musical academy in Venice with Antonio Molino around 1530. On 22 November 1552, he was replaced by Annibale Padovano and given an annual pension of seventy ducats. The date of his death is unknown.

== Works ==
Start of the Stephanium

Armonio wrote drama in Latin. His signature work is his five-act comedy Stephanium, which he wrote and first performed in the church of Santo Stefano in Venice at an unknown date. The play was successful, being praised by Marcantonio Sabellico for reviving Roman theatre. An undated edition was printed at Venice under the title Ioannis Harmonii Marsi comoedia Stephanium urbis venetae genio publice recitata. It contains further praise from Gregorio Amaseo and Lelio Gregorio Giraldi. Armonio also wrote a five-act tragedy, De rebus Italicis deque triumpho Ludovici XII regis Francorum tragoedia, about the Italian campaign of King Louis XII of France, probably around the same time he wrote the Stephanium. It was not as well received and is preserved only in a single manuscript from France. Both of his plays have received modern editions.

Armonio also wrote Latin poetry. In 1502, one of his poems was set to music and sung by Pietro de Fossis at a reception for Anne of Foix-Candale, then passing through Venice on her way to marry King Vladislaus II of Hungary. Gabrieli included the text in his account of the event, Libellus hospitalis munificentiae Venetorum in excipienda Anna regina Hungariae. Some of Armonio's poetry was also included in the second volume of Lodovico Domenichi's Rime diverse di molti eccellentissimi autori, printed at Venice in 1548.

If Armonio wrote any music during his thirty-six years as a professional organist, it has not survived.

== Bibliography ==
- Crimi, Giuseppe (2011). "Molino, Antonio". Dizionario Biografico degli Italiani (in Italian). Vol. 75: Miranda–Montano. Rome: Institute of the Italian Encyclopaedia. ISBN 978-88-12-00032-6.
- Ludwig, Walther, ed. (1971). Ioannis Harmonii Marsi Comoedia Stephanium. Wilhelm Fink Verlag.
- Quattrucci, Mario (1962). "Armonio, Giovanni". Dizionario Biografico degli Italiani (in Italian). Vol. 4: Arconati–Bacaredda. Rome: Institute of the Italian Encyclopaedia. OCLC 883370.
- Sherman, Allison (2020). Corsato, Carlo (ed.). The Lost Venetian Church of Santa Maria Assunta dei Crociferi: Form, Decoration, Patronage. Independent Publishing Network.
- Tournoy, Gilbert, ed. (1978). Iohannis Harmonii Marsi: De rebus Italicis deque triumpho Ludovici XII regis Francorum tragoedia. Leuven University Press. ISBN 978-90-6186-064-8.
- Tournoy, Gilbert (2012). "An Epic on the Amazons by Iohannes Harmonius Marsus?". Humanistica Lovaniensia. 61: 571–572. JSTOR 23974285.
