= Massimiliano Neri =

Italian fashion model (born 1977)

- Born: 14 June 1977 (age 49); Naples, Italy
- Modeling information
- Height: 6 ft 1/2 in (184 cm)
- Hair color: Dark blonde
- Eye color: Hazel

Massimiliano Neri (born 14 June 1977 in Naples, Italy) is an Italian fashion model.

== Early life ==
Neri was born in Naples, Italy, in 1977. As a teenager, he was very involved in sports, and he practised equestrianism professionally. During summer, he usually spent holidays in Capri. It was there that Neri met the photographer Bruce Weber, who took some pictures of Massimiliano while shooting with models Helena Christensen, and Alex Lundqvist for 1995 Versace's Campaign. Neri was only 17 years old. One month later, Jack Pierson came to Naples, who also wanted to take some pictures of him.

== Career ==
After sending those pictures to some model agencies in Milan, and eventually moving to Milan in 1995, he became known among the fashion designers after his first fashion season in Milan: working for many designers such as Gianfranco Ferré, Iceberg, Krizia, Versus, D&G, and Replay. However, celebrity to a larger public arrived after making a TV commercial for Versace's sunglasses, which was shown all over Europe. In New Zealand, he was given a place in a TV commercial for Levi's. Neri has also graced covers and editorials for magazines such as Cleo, L'Uomo Vogue, GQ, and Pulp Fashion. Furthermore, he was chosen as testimonial for the Rocco Barocco worldwide campaign of 2000 with models Natalia Vodianova, and Alessandra Ambrosio.

From 1995 onwards, he worked as a model in Milan, Sydney, Auckland, Tokyo, Miami, New York, and landed in Paris in 1998, where he settled down and started University. He graduated in Business Administration at ESSEC business school in Paris and took a master's degree in Financial Economics from the University of Leicester.

Neri has turned from fashion model to businessman, as the owner of restaurants and businesses in Italy. He keeps doing some modeling jobs. Neri was chosen as a Geox testimonial for its 2019 worldwide campaign.
