= Antonio Buzzolla =

Italian composer and conductor (1815–1871)

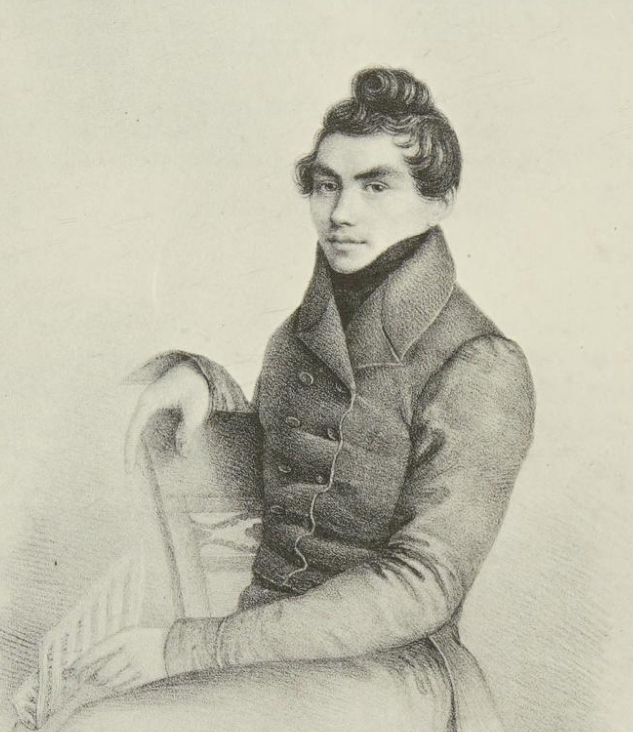
Antonio Buzzolla, c. 1840

Antonio Buzzolla (2 March 1815 – 20 March 1871) was an Italian composer and conductor.

== Life ==
Antonio Buzzolla was born in Adria on 2 March 1815. His father, Angelo Buzzolla, was the director of the chapel choir at the Adria Cathedral, and the conductor of the Adriese Philharmonic Society. He studied with Antonio Pizzolato in Venice from 1832, and he joined the orchestra of La Fenice as both flautist and violinist. His first opera, Il Ferramondo, was given its premiere at the Teatro Gallo on 3 December 1836; the success of which earned him a place in the Conservatorio di San Pietro a Majella in Naples. There he completed his studies under Gaetano Donizetti and Saverio Mercadante from 1837 to 1839. In Naples he gained a reputation as not only a composer of skill but a talented singer who performed his own ariettas and canzonettas in Venetian dialect.

Buzzolla returned to Venice in 1839 and had two more operas performed there, Mastino della Scala (1841) and Gli avventurieri (1842). In 1842 he composed his fist notable sacred work, a four part Mass for chorus and orchestra, for the Fondazione Musicale Santa Cecilia which was performed at St Mark's Basilica. He left for Berlin in 1843 and was a conductor at the Italian Opera. He composed a cantata in honor of Frederick William IV; the success of which earned him the position as music teacher to the king's daughters and granddaughters.

While principally based in Berlin, Buzzolla occasionally traveled for further studies and performances; including brief returns to Adria in 1845 and 1846 to conduct masses. After touring Poland and Russia, he went to Paris in 1847 and was a conductor at Théâtre Italien. He returned to Venice the following year and performed two more operas, Amleto (1848) and Elisabetta di Valois (1850). Beginning in 1855, he served as the maestro di cappella of the Cappella Marciana at St Mark's Basilica in Venice. In 1867 he co-founded the Società dei Concerti Benedetto Marcello, and in 1868 he was one of the composers invited by Giuseppe Verdi to contribute to the Messa per Rossini. He composed the opening movement, the Requiem aeternam in g minor.

He died in Venice on 20 March 1871, and was interred at the San Michele cemetery on the Isola di San Michele in Venice.

== Compositions ==
Composition list from Grove Music Online.

=== Sacred works ===
- Messa a quattro parti e piena orchestra
- Requiem a quattro
- Requiem aeternam e Kyrie della Messa per Rossini (1871 al Teatro La Fenice di Venezia con Teresa Stolz ed Achille De Bassini)
- Miserere, a tre voci
- many works for Cappella Marciana not published.

=== Piano Music ===
- Sonata [n. 1] in mi bemolle maggiore, Op. 1
- Sonata n. 2 in sol maggiore
- Marziale in do maggiore
- Notturno in fa minore
- Due valzer

=== Operas ===
- Ferramondo (Venezia, Teatro San Benedetto, 3 December 1836)
- Mastino I° della Scala (Venezia, Gran Teatro La Fenice, 31 May 1841)
- Gli Avventurieri (Venezia, Gran Teatro La Fenice, 14 May 1842)
- Amleto (Venezia, Gran Teatro La Fenice, 24 February 1848, libretto by Giovanni Peruzzini)
- Elisabetta di Valois (Venezia, Gran Teatro La Fenice, 16 February 1850)
- La puta onorata, (in Venetian dialect, after Carlo Goldoni) unfinished

=== Songs ===
- Serate a Rialto, a una voce con accompagnamento di pianoforte
- Il gondoliere, raccolta di dodici ariette veneziane
- I giardinieri, duetto in veneziano
- La campana del tramonto
- La desolada
- La farfala
- Un baso in falo
- Un ziro in gondola
- Mi e ti
- El fresco
- El canto
- Cantata funebre dei caduti di Solferino e S. Martino
