= Thomas Alexander Lacey =

Thomas Alexander Lacey (1853–1931), was an English Anglican Divine known as an advocate of the re-union of the Church of England with Rome.

Lacey was born in Nottingham. Educated at a Nottingham Grammar School, Lacey obtained a scholarship to Balliol College, University of Oxford aged seventeen. While a student, he became friends with Charles Gore and was a contemporary at Oxford with future Prime Minister H. H. Asquith. Following university, he worked first as a teacher at Wakefield Grammar School, and was ordained a deacon by the Bishop of Ripon in 1876. Two years later the Bishop raised him to the priesthood. He was made Canon of Worcester in 1918.
