= Giovanni Rovetta =

Italian composer (c1595/97–1668)

Giovanni Rovetta (c. 1595/97–1668) was an Italian Baroque composer and maestro di capella of the Capella Marciana at St Mark's Basilica, Venice between Monteverdi and Cavalli.

He may have been a choirboy at St. Mark's, where his father played: the earliest document is of his admission in December 1614 as a permanent member of the capella and he remained at S. Marco for the rest of his career. He was a chorister, instrumentalist, bass, and vice-director under Monteverdi, and finally served as Monteverdi's successor from 1664 until his death. He was also the director of the Ospedale dei Derelitti (Ospedaletto) between 1635 and 1647. His students included his nephew Giovanni Battista Volpe (known as Rovettino) and the Venetian composer Giovanni Legrenzi.

His compositions include several volumes of madrigals and a great deal of sacred music, especially masses, psalms, and motets. His style reflects Monteverdi's influence, although certain pieces show a distinct and individual talent for melody. A ceremonial mass, dating from 1639, counts among his most successful works. He also wrote collections of instrumental music (Canzoni per sonare). He composed one opera, Ercole in Lidia (1645, Teatro Novissimo, Venice, now lost) and withdrew from another project, Argiope (1649).
