= Giovanni Battista Volpe =

Italian composer

Giovanni Battista Volpe (c. 1620–1691) was a Venetian composer for operas during the Baroque period. He was also known as Rovetta and Rovettino.

Volpe was an organist at St Mark's Basilica, and succeeded Giovanni Legrenzi as maestro di capella of the Cappella Marciana from 1690 until 1691. His uncle was Giovanni Rovetta, a composer and former maestro di capella.

He collaborated with the librettist Aurelio Aureli on several projects. Volpe composed the music for the opera La costanza di Rosmonda, which premiered in Venice's Teatro Santi Giovanni e Paolo in 1659. He then composed the music for the opera Gl'amori d'Apollo e di Leucotoe, which premiered in the same theatre in 1663. He composed at least one more opera for the theatre.

Volpe was the preferred choice of composers in absentia when changes had to be made to their work.

== Compositions ==
- La costanza di Rosmonda, libretto by Aurelio Aureli (premiered 1659)
- Gl'amori d'Apollo e di Leucotoe, libretto by Aurelio Aureli (premiered 1663)
