= San Giovanni Evangelista, Venice =

15th-century church in Venice

San Giovanni Evangelista
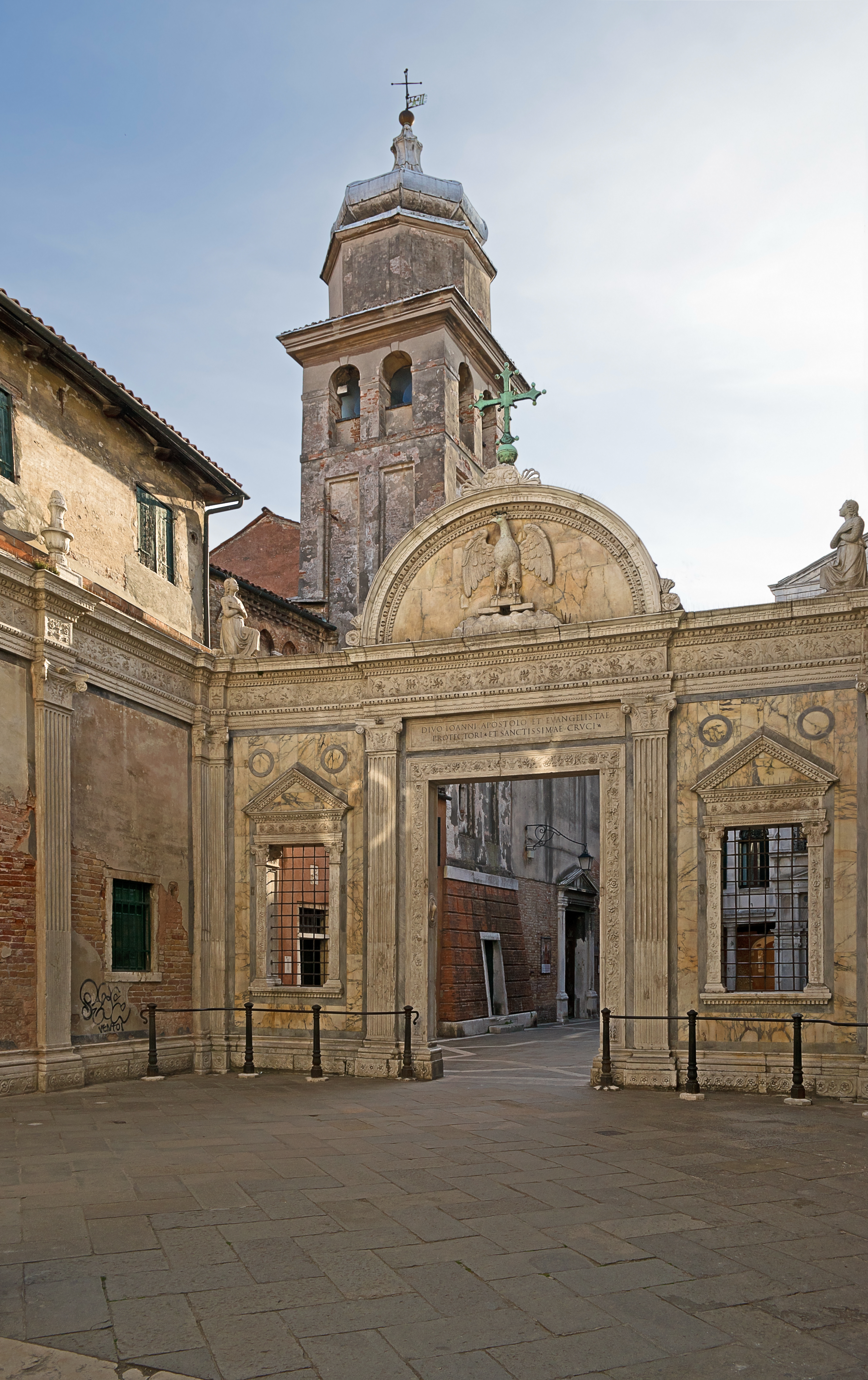
- San Giovanni Evangelista

- Location within Venice Location within Italy

Religion
- Affiliation: Roman Catholic
- Province: Venice

Location
- Location: Venice, Italy
- Interactive map of San Giovanni Evangelista
- Coordinates: 45.438°N 12.326°E

Architecture
- Completed: 15th-century

The church of San Giovanni Evangelista is a 15th-century religious building in the San Polo sestiere of the Italian city of Venice. It stands across a courtyard from the Scuola Grande di San Giovanni Evangelista.

== History ==
Construction on the church has taken place in three phases, the first in 1425. Reconstruction has taken place in 1645 and again recently to repair earthquake damage.

San Giovanni Evangelista was historically decorated by a series of frescoes, depicting both biblical and classical themes. Some art from San Giovanni has been removed for display at international museums or scholarly research.

== Description ==
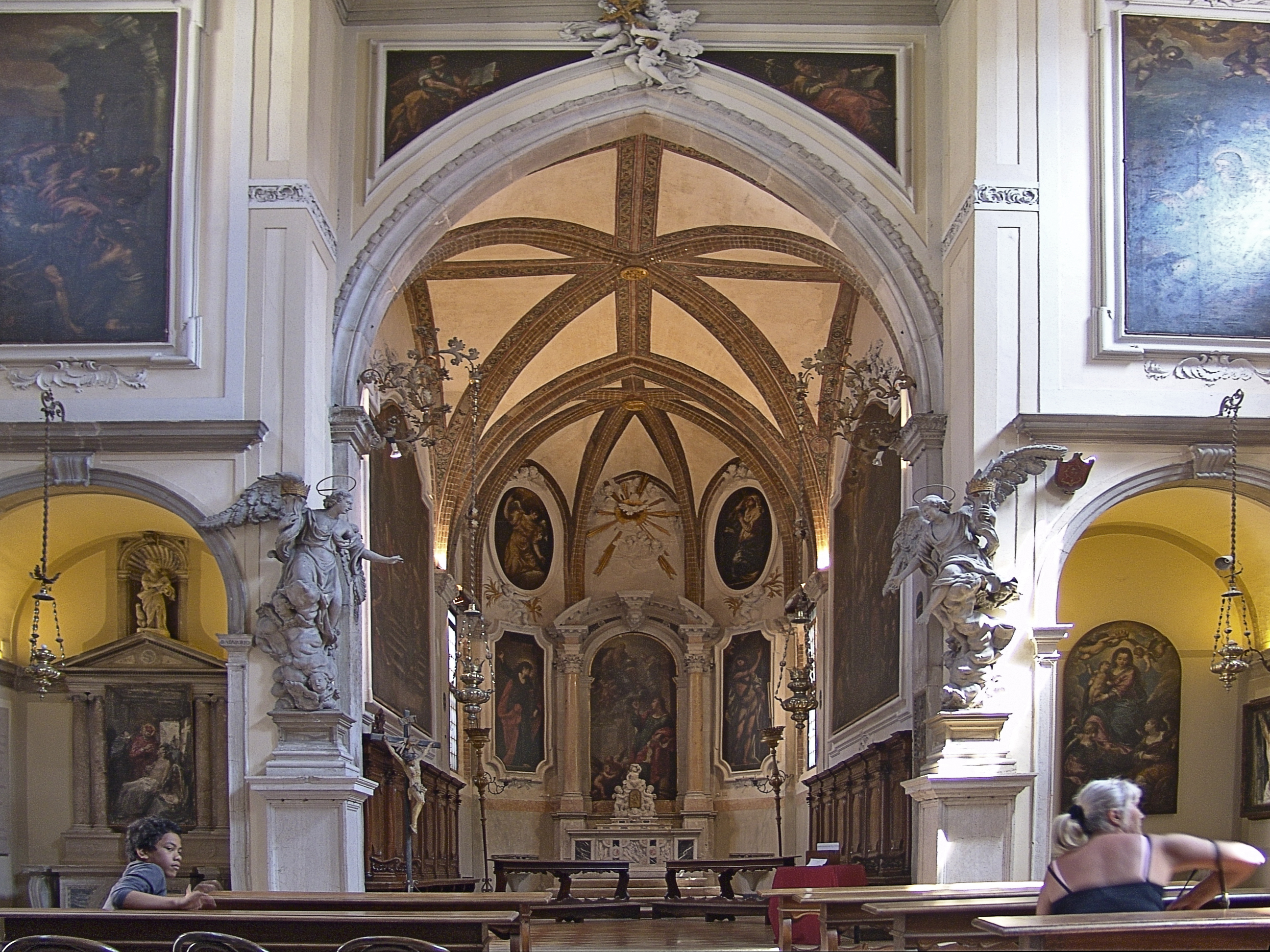
Nave and choir

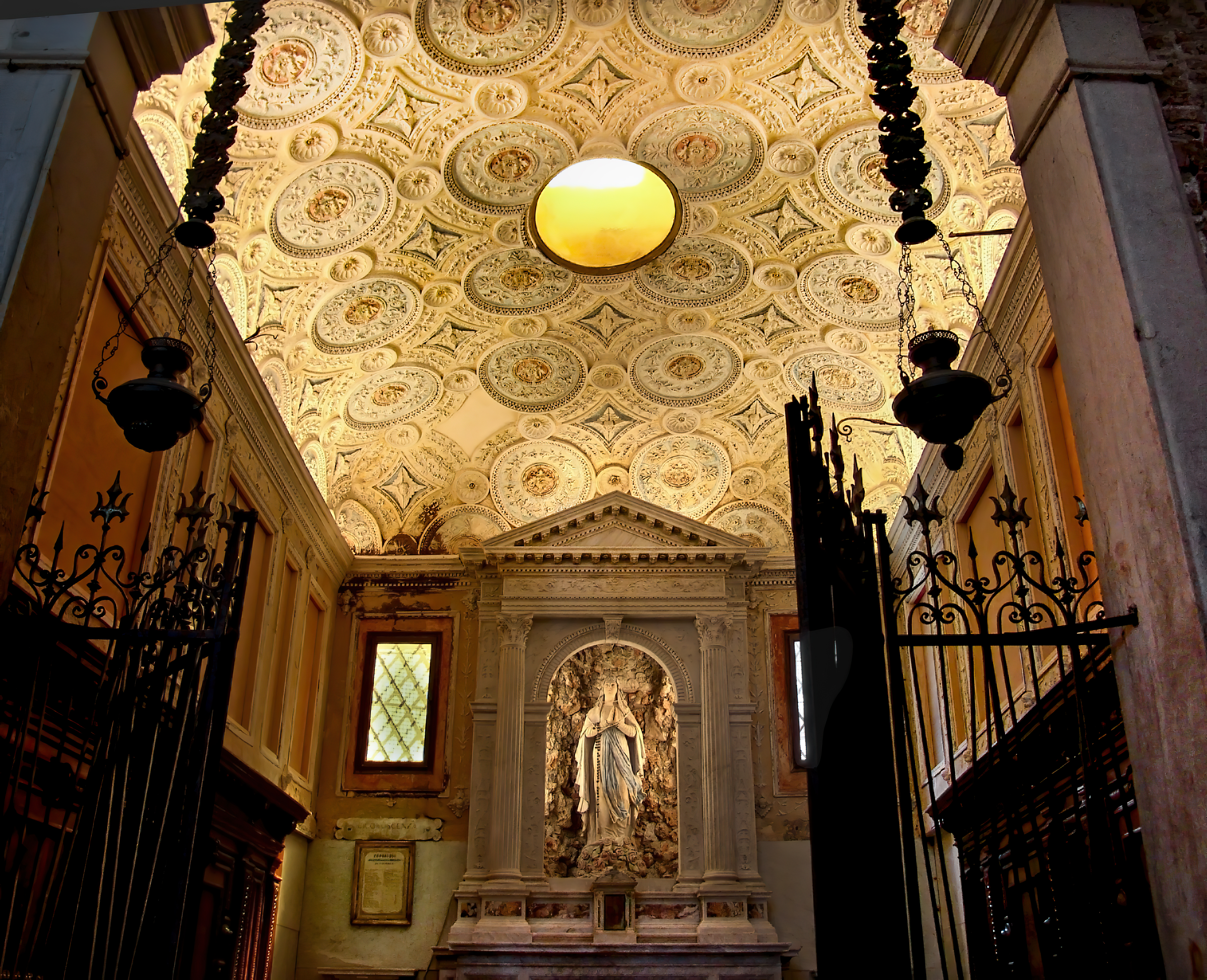
Chapel of the Virgin

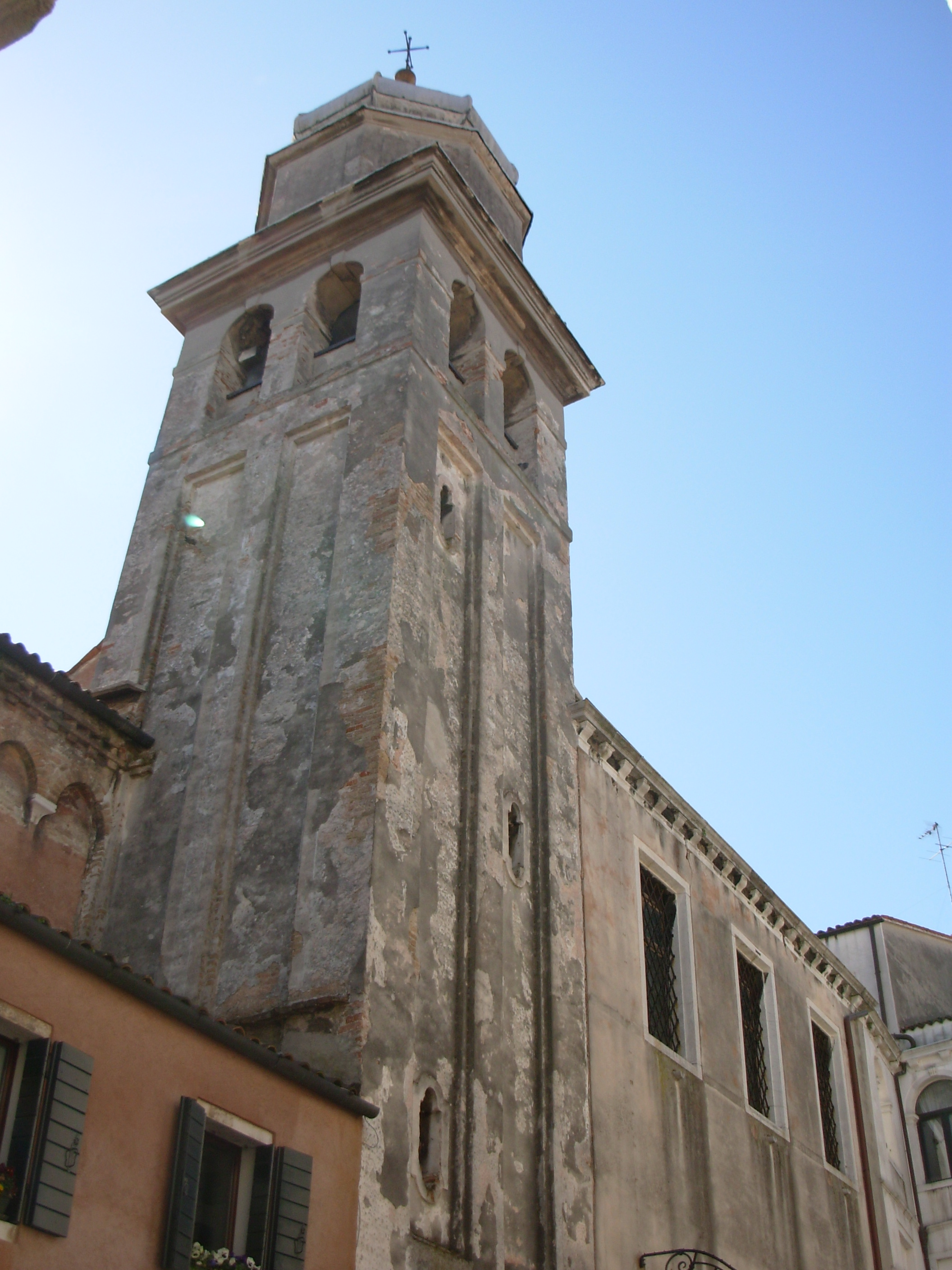
Bell Tower

== Tourism ==
It is located on the Calle del Magazzen close to the Scuola Grande di San Rocco. The church accepts visitors between Monday to Friday 9.30am to 12.30pm.
