= Oreste Ravanello =

Italian composer

Oreste Ravanello (25 August 1871 in Venice – 2 July 1938 in Padua) was an Italian composer and organist.

Ravanello studied organ and composition at the Liceo Musicale in Venice before he was appointed organist of the San Marco Cathedral at the age of seventeen. He also taught at the (now Benedetto Marcello) Conservatory of Music in Venice, and then became director of Istituto Musicale in Padua (now the "Cesare Pollini" Conservatory of Music).

== Activity ==
He became a well-known recitalist well known for his improvisations. He was above all remembered for his compositions which are especially intended for the church: ca. 30 Masses, Te Deums etc. but also numerous works for organ and piano. His language is late romantic and melodious.

== Works ==
- CORALE FANTASIA, OP. 7
- QUATTRO PEZZI FACILI, OP. 12
  - 1. Preludio
  - 2. Pastorale
  - 3. Fughetta dorica
  - 4. Elevazione
- SETTE TRII, OP. 25
  - 1. O crux, ave
  - 2. Qui odit animam suam
  - 3. Lucis creator optime
  - 4. Corale
  - 5. Corale
  - 6. Corale
  - 7. Larghetto pastorale
- SEI PEZZI, OP. 27
  - 1. Praeludium super Agnus Dei
  - 2. Praeludium super Te Lucis
  - 3. Meditazione super Ave Regina Cœlorum
  - 4. Elevazione o Comunione super Alma Redemptoris
  - 5. Interludium super Salve Regina
  - 6. Postludium super Regina Coeli
- SETTE CORALI, OP. 29
  - 1. O quam metuendus est
  - 2. Adoro Te devote
  - 3. Agnus Dei
  - 4. Stabat Mater
  - 5. Salve Regina
  - 6. Inviolata
  - 7. Te Deum
- QUATTRO PEZZI PER GRAND’ORGANO, OP. 39
  - 1. Preludio romantico
  - 2. Musette – Méditation
  - 3. Elevazione
  - 4. Marcia eucaristica
- TRE PEZZI PER GRAND’ORGANO, OP. 40
  - 1. Prélude gothique
  - 2. Chanson nordique
  - 3. Toccata
- SEI PEZZI PER GRAND’ORGANO, OP. 50
  - 1. Preludio in forma di studio
  - 2. Preghiera
  - 3. Musette
  - 4. Elegia
  - 5. Fughetta
  - 6. Christus resurrexit
- SCENE AL PRESEPIO, Op. 129 (1935), for organ or harmonium
  - 1. I Magi, preludio pastorale
  - 2. Notte di Natale, cantilena
  - 3. Campane all'alba, pastorale
- MYSTICA, OP. 133
  - 1. Noël
  - 2. La Madeleine et le Divin Jardinier
  - 3. Gesù spira sulla croce
