= Giovanni Battista Grillo =

Italian composer and organist

Giovanni Battista Grillo (late 16th-century – mid-November 1622) was an Italian composer and organist.

Little is known about Grillo until he was elected organist to the Venetian confraternity 'Scuola Grande di S Rocco' on 28 August 1612. This was a prominent position in the musical life of the city. Also, he was appointed the first organist of San Marco on 30 December 1619. He died in Venice.

His music follows Giovanni Gabrieli, especially his Sacri consensus ac Symphonia (Venice 1618), which includes vocal canzonas up to 12 parts, using cori spezzati. He is also known for three instrumental canzonas published in Raveri's collection Canzoni per sonare con ogni sorte di stromenti (Venice, 1608).

== List of works ==
- Il primo libro delle canzonette a 3 voci (Venice, 1600)
- Il secondo libro delle canzonette a 3 voci (Venice, 1600)
- Canzoni per sonare con ogni sorte di strumenti a 4, 5 e 8… libro I (Venice, 1608)
- Musica vaga et artificiosa (Venice, 1615)
- Symbolae diversorum musicorum, a 2, 3, 4 e 5 voci…, (Venice, 1620)
- Seconda raccolta de sacri canti a 1, 2, 3 e 4 voci, de diversi eccellentissimi autori (Venice, 1624)
- Venezianische Canzonen (Mainz, 1958)
- Alessandro Raverij's collection of canzoni per sonare, Venice, 1608 (The Hague, 1965)
- Sonatas and canzonas from the Sacri concentus ac symphoniae, Venice 1618 (New York-London, 1989)
