= Nakkaş Sinan Bey =

Nakkaş Sinan Bey (also sometimes referred to as "Sinan Beg", or Sīnan ibn Saʿātī) was an Ottoman court miniature painter who lived in the 15th century during Mehmed II's reign. Trained by a European master Maestro Pavli (Paolo da Ragusa), a critically lauded artist in Venice, Sinan Bey and his later students (such as Şiblizade Ahmed of Bursa) both specialized in Pavli's field — portraiture — a brand new artistic genre in Ottoman history and tradition. Together, they are known for synthesizing Eastern and Western aesthetics with the application of new materials, techniques, and themes from Italian art to represent their native culture.

== Life ==
The world of Sinan Bey and his career is shaped by the reign of Mehmed II, particularly his cosmopolitan vision and tendency towards integrating European visual elements into the indigenous representation of himself and the entire empire, which stemmed from his wish to foster intercultural relations and political alliances.

=== Early life and education ===
Born and raised in a Muslim family, Sinan Bey is either the son of a known calligrapher associated with the Court, or a slave or devsirme recruit. Raby points out that his full name on undated tombstone now in the Bursa Museum provides and links him to clocks or timekeeping (his patronymic on the gravestone — “ibn Saʿātī” means “son of the timekeeper”). Raby links this name to the calligrapher ʿAli ibn Mazid al-mushtahir bi al-Saʿati, mentioned in a Muraqqa (album) possessed by the University Library Istanbul, who may be Sinan Beg’s father. This would make Sinan a third-generation Muslim, and suggests that his father trained him.

=== Artistic influence ===
Given his father's association with the royal court, Sinan Bey grew up in Mehmed II’s court, enjoying an elite education and was employed in several important positions, functioning both as an artist and a diplomat for the Ottoman Empire.

In his early years, Sinan Bey was either “sent abroad for training or trained with Maestro Pavli in the sultan’s palace,” not only developing in his area of profession, but also widening his ken and globalizing his awareness in general.

Sinan Bey's training in Italy equipped him with mastery of foreign painting techniques, where he was able to absorb Italian Renaissance stylistic innovations and adapt it to the artistic practices of his own culture (see below). Visits by Italian painters such as Gentile Bellini and Costanzo da Ferrara inspired a new demand for naturalistic painting at the Ottoman court. Thanks to his ability as a local artist to connect the West and the East, Sinan Bey became the sultan's preferred court painter. With that, his artistic practices contributed to creating "an Ottoman pictorial manner that is distinctively Rūmī (i.e., pertaining to the lands of [Eastern] Rome, comprising Anatolia and the Balkans)".

=== Diplomatic influence ===
Besides from being an artist, Sinan's occupation as a court interpreter and his continuous, diplomatic undertaking in Venice suggests that he also mastered verbal translation across cultures as he did for visual.

==== The "Sinan affair" ====
In regard to Sinan's international linkages, Venetian documents record his negotiation on behalf of the Ottomans between 1479 and 1480, demonstrating his diplomatic importance in the court. His diplomatic activity focused on the so-called "Sinan affair," the negotiation of a financial damage that occurred to Sinan on 25 January 1479. Scipio Bon, a sopracomito (captain of a galley in the Venetian navy) from Italy, captured two Ottoman merchant ships in the Gulf of Thiasso and sold their goods for 16,000 aspers, including goods belonging to Sinan. Fearing that this unintended attack would destroy the already fragile relationship between the two polities, the Signoria forced Bon to compensate Sinan immediately, knowing that he had a tight connection with the Sultan and thus much political power.

== Important works ==
General surviving works of Mehmed II's portraits are quite limited, let alone documentation on those by Sinan Bey and his student Şiblizade Ahmed of Bursa. Due to its remarkable fame, Portrait of Mehmed II Smelling a Rose (ca. 1480-81) is the only work that is officially known to be a work either by the master or the pupil. Others are all unsigned, whose attribution could only rely on uncertain scholarly guess.

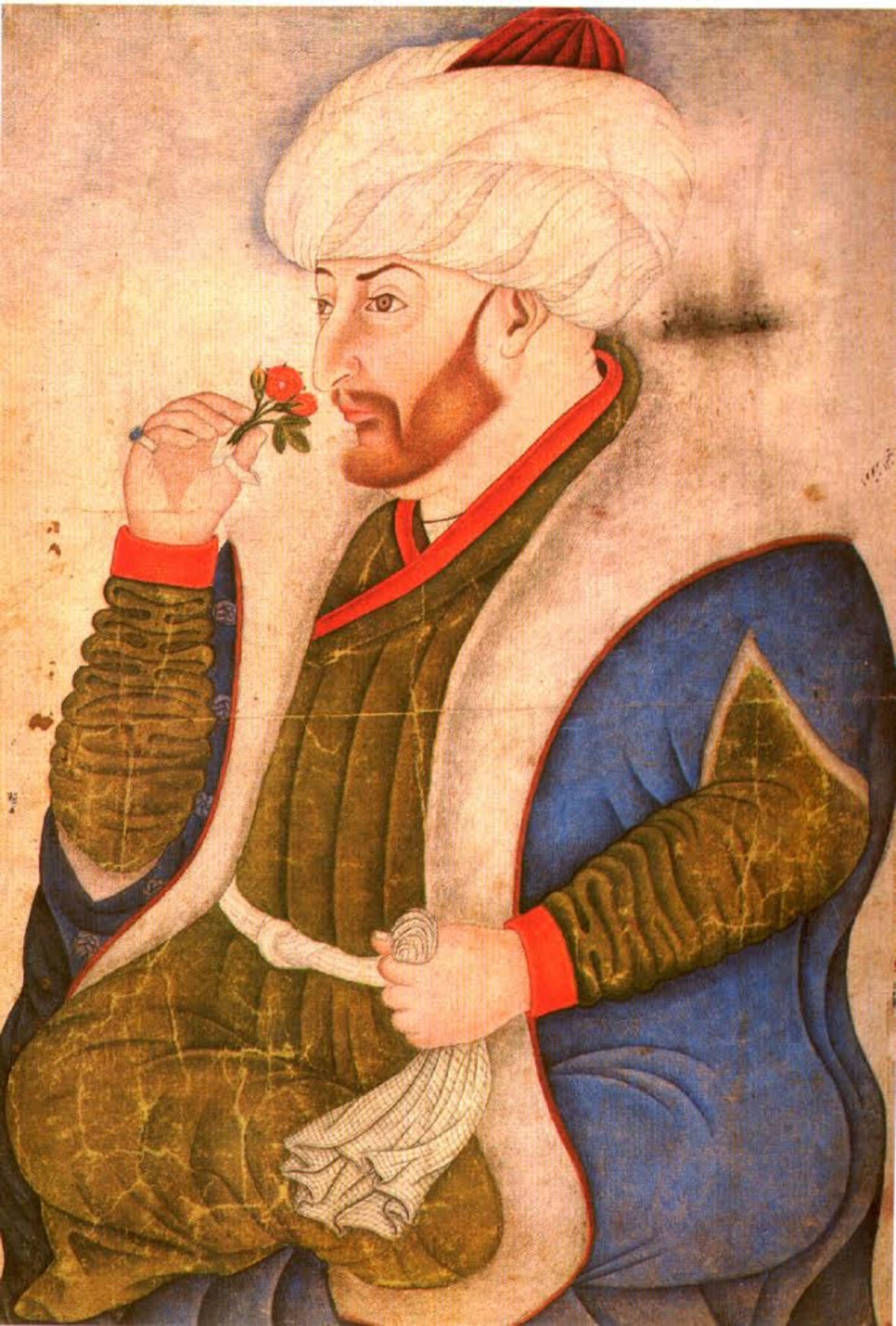
Sinan Bey or Şiblizade Ahmed (attr.), Mehmed II Smelling a Rose, ca. 1480-81. Watercolor on paper. 390 x 270 mm. Topkapi Palace Museum, Istanbul.

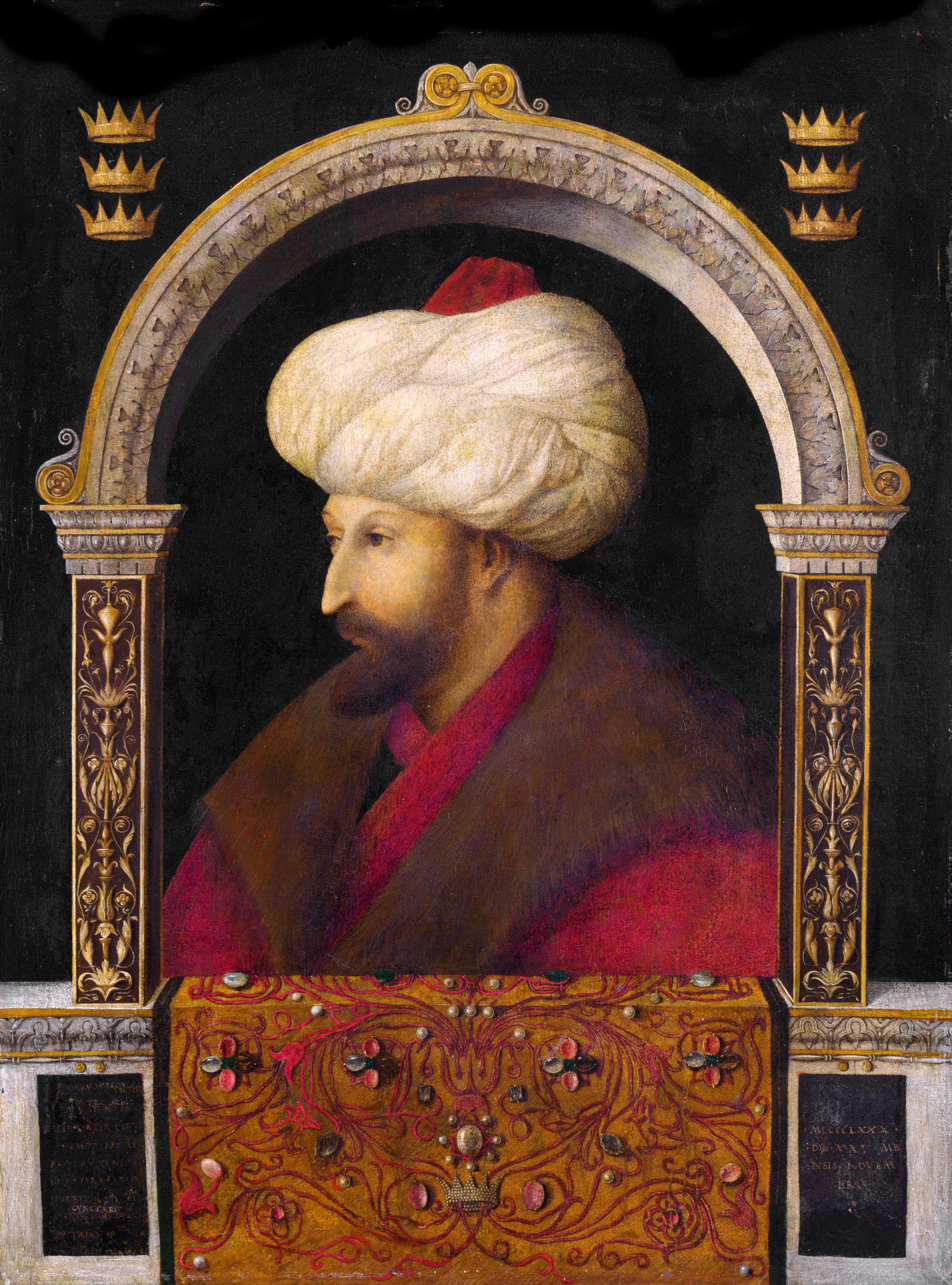
Gentile Bellini, Portrait of Mehmet II, 1480. Oil on canvas. 70 cm × 52 cm (28 in × 20 in). National Gallery, London.

Portrait of Mehmed II Smelling a Rose (ca. 1480-81)

The painting Portrait of Mehmed II Smelling a Rose was created based on Portrait of Mehmet II (ca. 1480) by famous Italian painter Gentile Bellini, but with an unusually small scale. Some scholars suggest that the creation is likely to be prompted by the sultan either "implicitly or explicitly challenging other artists at his court to surpass Gentile's masterful likeness of him." The work does not have a definitive attribution to its authorship, given that very little is known about the imperial atelier of Mehmed II. It is widely referred to as a work by Sinan Bey or his pupil Şiblizade Ahmed of Bursa by scholars specialized in Ottoman studies. Nevertheless, the painting incorporates West Asian artistic conventions, which makes this assumption plausible.

In his depiction, the artist transforms Bellini's work into a full-body portrait with an unusually broad chest and other enlarged features. Above all, the sultan's facial characteristics in the two paintings are particularly alike, given this Ottoman piece demonstrated the application of modeling and volume, two techniques associated with the flourishing style during the Italian Renaissance.

Though retaining the overall perspective, turban, and facial features from Gentile's representation, the artist incorporated conventions from Timurid art to his depiction. Some artistic choices in Gentile's painting were replaced by typical stylistic features observed in a Timurid royal portraiture: the frontal, cross-legged pose of the sultan, the iconography of flower, handkerchief, and archer’s thumb ring. Stemming from its Timurid origin, the flower could entail several connotations such as the sultan's genteel demeanor, refined intellect, and interest in gardens, while the ring around his finger implies his "military achievements and skill as a hunter." A poem called Mehmet Sniffing a Rose by Lillias Bever specifically dedicated to the description and commentary on the painting, giving detailed account of the painting's characteristics while satirizing the hidden cruelty of Mehmed II under his delicate gesture of sniffing a rose.

With the aforementioned cultural pluralism that permeated Ottoman art-making practices during Mehmed II's reign, this painting is well-known for being an empirical example of such a phenomenon. It is, furthermore, a graphic sign that Mehmed fostered a fertile ground for portraiture art to thrive while creating an "Ottoman idiom in portraiture that would stand out from both Italianate and Persianate models".

Bust Portrait of Mehmed II, (ca. 1478–81)

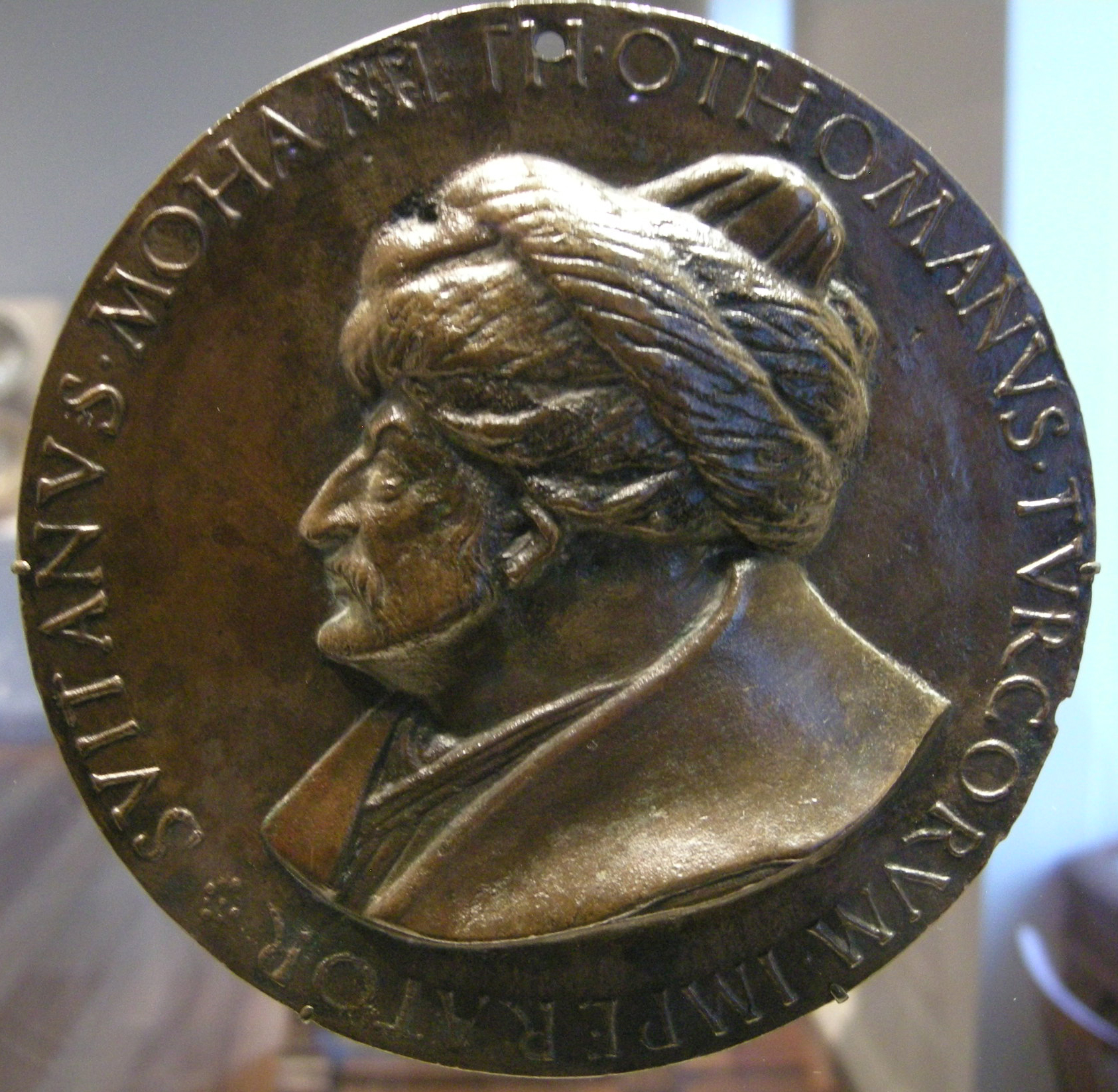
Costanzo da Ferrara, First medal of Mehmet II, ca. 1477-80. Bronze. 11.5cm diameter (4.5 in). The National Gallery of Art, Washington DC.

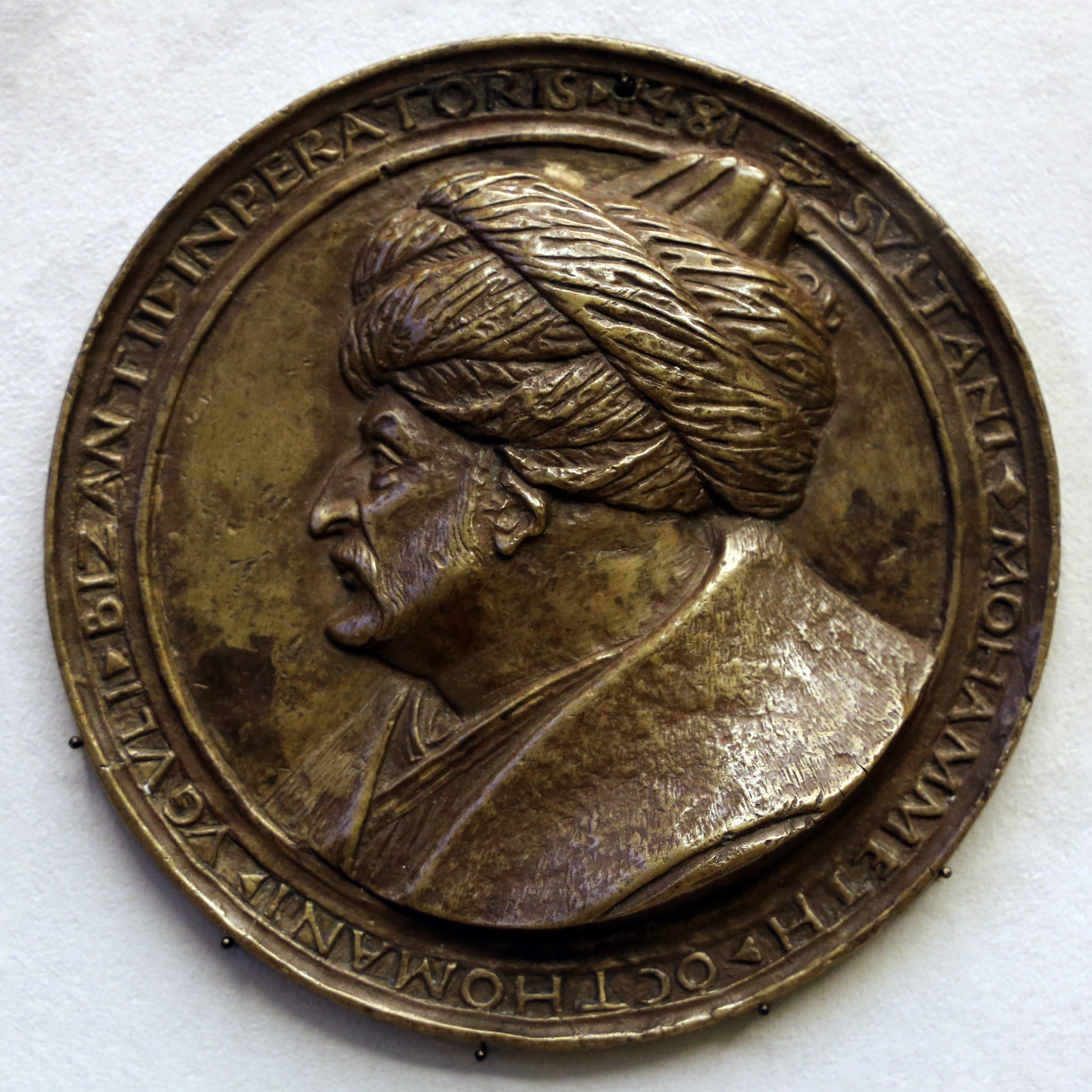
Costanzo da Ferrara, Second Medal of Mehmed II, ca. 1478-81. 11.5cm diameter (4.5 in).

The work is currently part of the Topkapı Palace Museum Library's collection in Istanbul, and there is no illustration available for it in the public domain. For visualization, see Necipoǧlu's essays. (Note: To see a high-quality representation of Sinan Bey's attributed work Bust of Portrait of Mehmed II, please go to either essay by Grülu: page 36 of "Visual Cosmopolitanism and Creative Translation: Artistic Conversations with Renaissance Italy in Mehmed II's Constantinople" or page 274 in "From Byzantine Constantinople to Ottoman Kostantiniyye: Creation of a Cosmopolitan Capital and Visual Culture Under Sultan Mehmed II.") For more detailed catalogue information, see footnotes. (Note: Sinan Beg (attr.), Bust Portrait of Mehmed II, ca. 1478–81. Watercolor and gold on paper. Istanbul, Topkapı Palace Museum Library, Album H. 2153, fol. 145v. (Photo: courtesy of the Topkapı Palace Museum Library).)

Dated approximately between 1478–81, the painting was done using watercolor as the main medium with fine brushwork. It shows a profile picture of Mehmed II facing the left from a side perspective, portraying him only up to his shoulder. The Sultan is dressed in a black coat with a green undercoat, wearing a white turban with a red crowning knot on the top. The subject retains a placid facial expression, looking straight to the front, and his facial anatomy and features are captured in a detailed and precise manner. Thin but crisp lines are deployed to emphasize the contour of important shapes. The artist applies sole gold to the background for this portrait, which recalls the tradition in Byzantine art and "mosaics in its abstract quality". Therefore, the artist was not only domesticating foreign techniques, but also material. Similar artistic choices also characterize the Seated Painter, also sometimes attributed to Sinan Beg (see below).

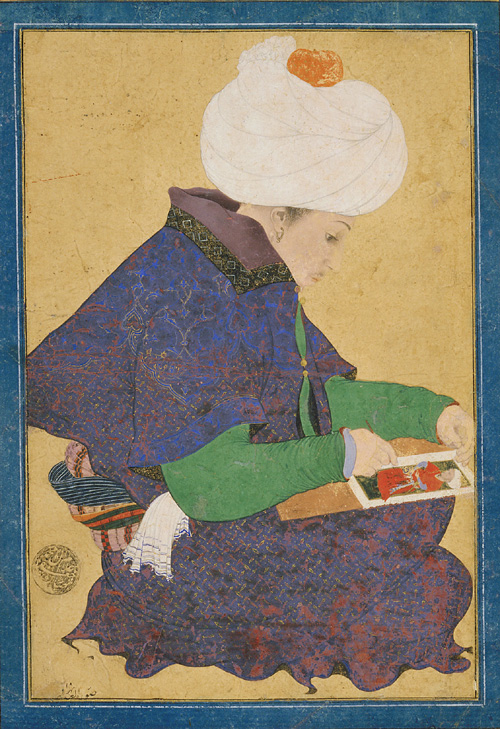
Sinan Beg (attr.), Seated Painter, ca. 1478–81. Opaque watercolor and gold on paper. Freer Gallery of Art, Smithsonian Institution, Washington, D.C. Accession: F1932.28.

Since the painting does not have a signature, scholars remain unsure about its authorship. It is attributed to Sinan Bey by Julian Raby. The painting closely echoes the images of Mehmed II on Costanzo da Ferrara, an Italian painter and medalist. The irrefutable proximity of the painting and the medals' portrayal makes the painting highly likely to be a rectangular "close copy of either Costanzo's medal or a lost painting by the artist".

Seated Painter (ca. 1478–81)

The authorship of this painting is highly contested. Although Raby and other specialists have attributed to Sinan Bey, the official page for this exhibit on the museum's website does not acknowledge any author for the work.

Different from the other two works addressed in this section, the subject of this painting is not the sultan, but an anonymous Turkish painter.
