= Ottoman claim to Roman succession =

Historical claim to succeed the Roman Empire

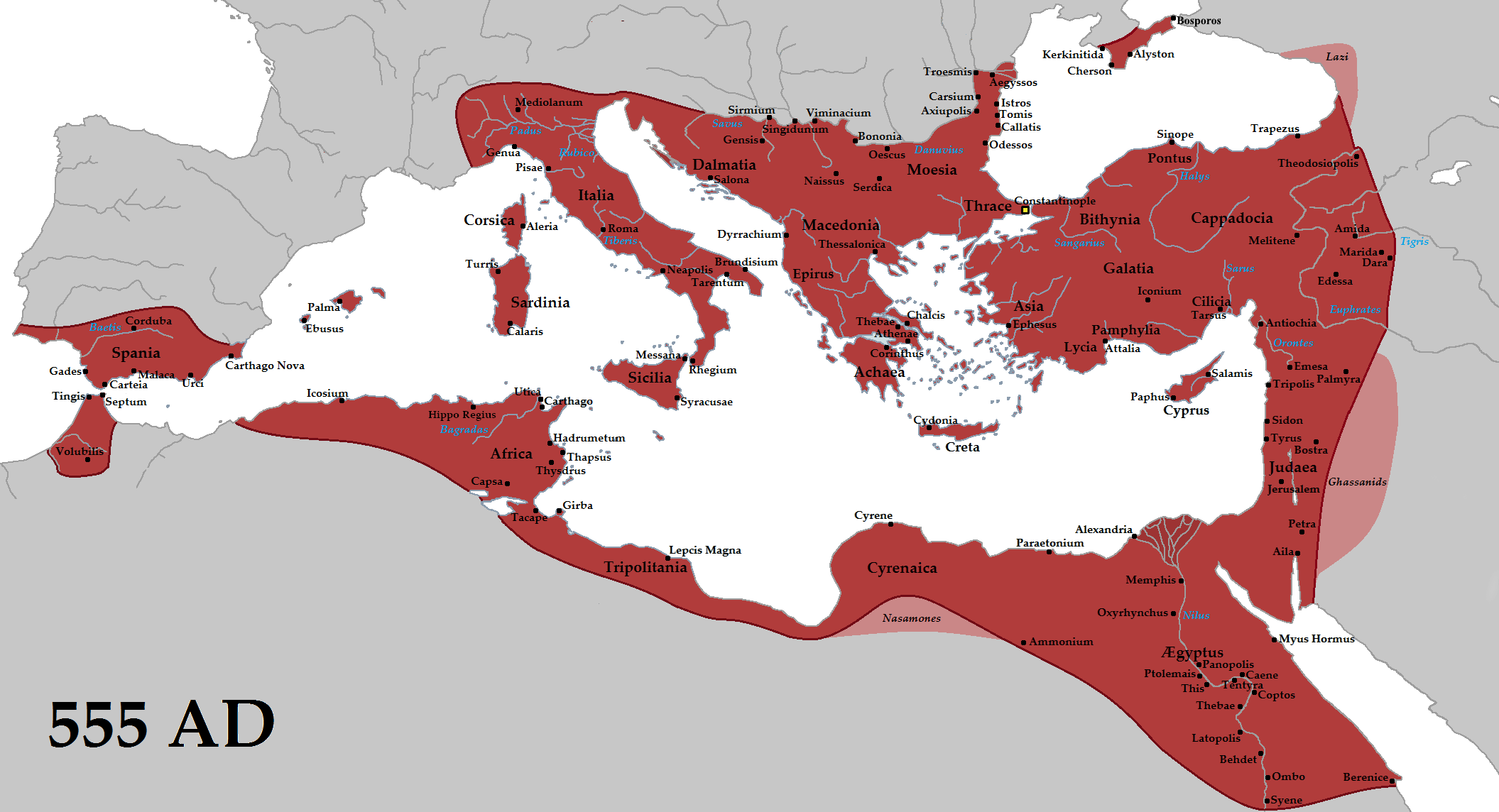
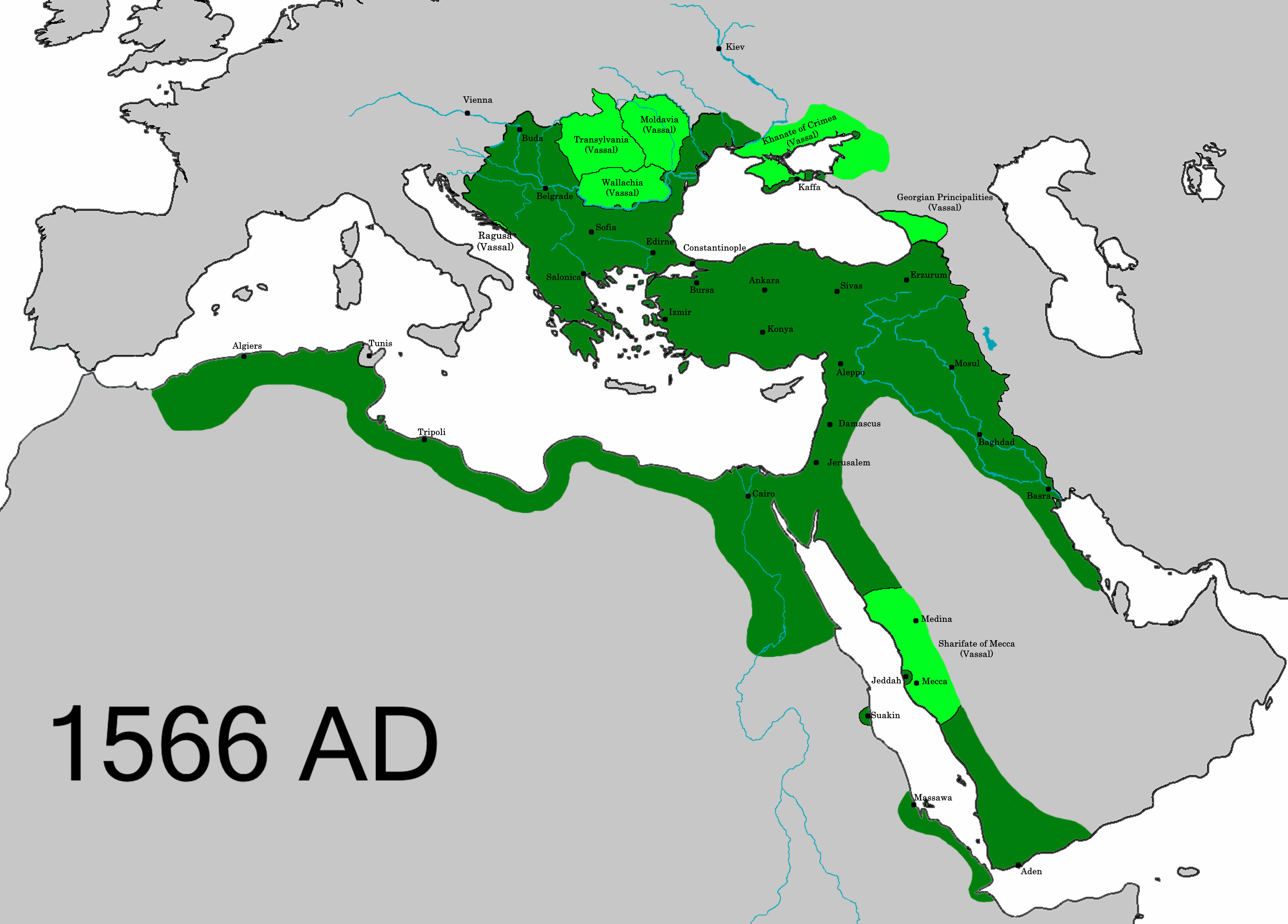
Map of the Byzantine Empire under Justinian I in 555 (top) and the Ottoman Empire under Suleiman I in 1566 (bottom)

After the conquest of Constantinople in 1453, the sultans of the Ottoman Empire laid claim to represent the legitimate Roman emperors. This claim was based on the right of conquest and mainly rested on possession of Constantinople, capital of the Byzantine (Eastern Roman) Empire for over a millennium. The sultans could also claim to be rulers of the Romans since they ruled over the former Byzantine populace, which continued to identify as such. Various titles were used by the sultans to stress their claim, including kayser-i rûm ("Caesar of Rome") and basileus (the Byzantine ruling title).

The early sultans after the conquest of Constantinople of the Classical Age—Mehmed II, Bayezid II, Selim I and Suleiman I—staunchly maintained that they were Roman emperors and went to great lengths to legitimize themselves as such. Constantinople was maintained as the imperial capital, Greek aristocrats (descendants of Byzantine nobility) were promoted to senior administrative positions, and architecture and culture experienced profound Byzantine influence. The claim of succession to the Roman Empire was also used to justify campaigns of conquest against Western Europe, including attempts to conquer Italy.

The Ottomans never formally dropped their claim to Roman imperial succession and never formally abandoned their Roman imperial titles, though the claim gradually faded and ceased to be stressed by the sultans. This development was a result of the Ottoman Empire increasingly claiming Islamic political legitimacy from the sixteenth century onwards, a result of Ottoman conquests in the Levant, Arabia, and North Africa having turned the empire from a multi-religious state to a state with a clear Muslim majority population. In turn, this necessitated a claim to legitimate political power rooted in Islamic rather than Roman tradition. Kayser-i Rûm was last used officially in the eighteenth century and sultans ceased to be referred to as basileus in Greek-language documents in the nineteenth century.

Recognition of the Ottoman claim to be Roman emperors was variable, both outside and within the Ottoman Empire. In the Islamic world, the Ottoman sultans were widely recognized as Roman emperors. The majority of the empire's Christian populace also recognized the sultans as their new emperors, though views were more variable among the cultural elite. From at least 1474 onwards, the Ecumenical Patriarchate of Constantinople recognized the sultans by the title basileus. The Christian populace of the empire generally did not see the Ottoman Empire as a seamless continuation of the Byzantine Empire, but rather as an heir or successor of sorts, inheriting the former empire's legitimacy and right to universal rule. In Western Europe, the sultans were generally recognized as emperors, but not Roman emperors, an approach similar to how Western Europeans had treated the Byzantine emperors. The Ottoman claim to Roman emperorship and universal rule was challenged for centuries by the rulers of the Holy Roman Empire and the Russian Empire, both of whom claimed this dignity for themselves.

== Background ==
=== Political context ===
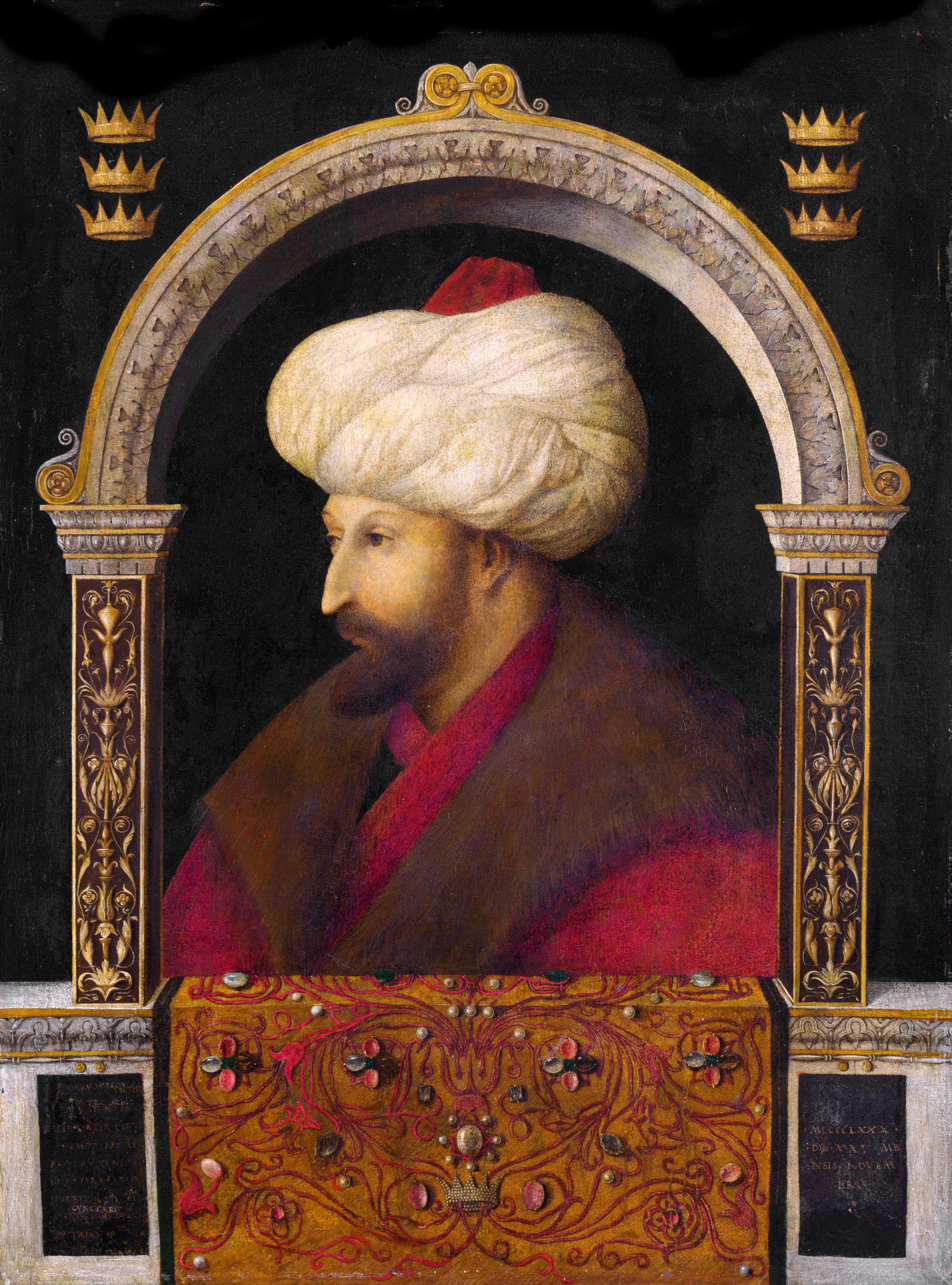
15th-century portrait of Mehmed II by Gentile Bellini

The Eastern Roman Empire, also referred to as the Byzantine Empire by historians, traced its origin to the foundation of Constantinople in 330 AD. Constantinople was established by Emperor Constantine I (r. 306–337) as the new capital of the Roman Empire and had by 450 eclipsed the original Rome in both size and status. While the Western Roman Empire collapsed in the fifth century, the Byzantine Empire survived more or less intact. Throughout its history, the populace of the Byzantine Empire continuously maintained that they were Romaioi (Romans) and not Hellenes (Greeks), even as the imperial borders gradually reduced to mostly encompass Greek-speaking lands.

By the fifteenth century, the Byzantine emperors ruled a disintegrating and dwindling empire, weakened by centuries of conflicts. Over the course of the fourteenth century, the Ottoman Empire—originally a minor Anatolian Turkish beylik—conquered vast territories and by the early fifteenth century, the Ottoman sultans ruled much of Anatolia, Bulgaria, central Greece, Serbia, Macedonia and Thessaly. The Ottoman expansion reduced the Byzantine Empire to the imperial capital of Constantinople itself, the Peloponnese, and a handful of islands in the Aegean Sea. The emperors were furthermore forced to pay tribute to the Ottomans.

In 1453, the Ottoman sultan Mehmed II laid siege to and conquered Constantinople. The fall of Constantinople is often regarded to have marked the definitive end of the Roman Empire, as well as the final and decisive step in the Ottoman conquest of its core lands and subjects. The conquest also marked the true birth of the Ottoman Empire, which would go on to dominate much of the eastern Mediterranean until its fall in 1922. The conquest of Constantinople had been a goal and dream of Islamic armies since the eighth century.

Through possession of Constantinople, which had served as the Roman capital for more than a millennium, Mehmed II and his successors were able to claim to be the heirs of the Roman emperors. Mehmed had a great interest in Roman and classical Greek history. The sultan emulated himself on Julius Caesar and Alexander the Great, and is known to at one point have visited the city of Troy to see the graves of the mythological Greek heroes Achilles and Ajax.

=== Ottoman conception of Rome ===
In Western Europe, recognition of the Byzantine Empire as the Roman Empire gradually faded away after the ninth century, in favor of the papally supported Holy Roman Empire. In contrast, Muslim sources in the Middle Ages continued to refer to the Byzantine Empire and its inhabitants as Roman. In early Muslim sources, Christians as a whole are generally referred to as Rūmī ("Romans"), though the term later became restricted to just refer to the Byzantines.

When discussing Byzantine emperors, early Ottoman historians mainly used three different terms: tekfur, fasiliyus and kayser. This is despite the Ottomans most commonly equating the title of "emperor" with the term padişah. The most common title applied to the Byzantine emperors by the Ottomans was tekfur, which might derive from the Armenian taghavor ("crown-bearer"), perhaps ultimately originating as a misspelling of the name of Byzantine emperor Nikephoros II Phokas. In pre-1453 sources, the Ottomans used tekfur for Byzantine government servants of all ranks, thus giving it a demeaning connotation when applied to the emperor. The titles fasiliyus and kayser are derived from the Byzantine imperial titles basileus and Caesar, respectively. Some Ottoman historians used the more elaborate kayser-i Rûm ("Caesar of Rome") for the Byzantine emperors.

Even before the conquest of Constantinople, some Ottoman rulers made steps towards Roman legitimacy. The fourth Ottoman sultan, Bayezid I (r. 1389–1402) styled himself as the sultan-ı Rûm ("sultan of Rome"), a claim that was accepted at least in Timurid sources, wherein Bayezid is referred to as qayṣar-i Rūm. Unlike the Roman aspirations of Mehmed II and his successors, Bayezid's assumption of the title was an attempt to claim the legacy of the Sultanate of Rum (1077–1308) and thus challenge the other beyliks in Anatolia, not to claim succession to the Roman Empire.

== History ==
=== Mehmed II (1453–1481) ===
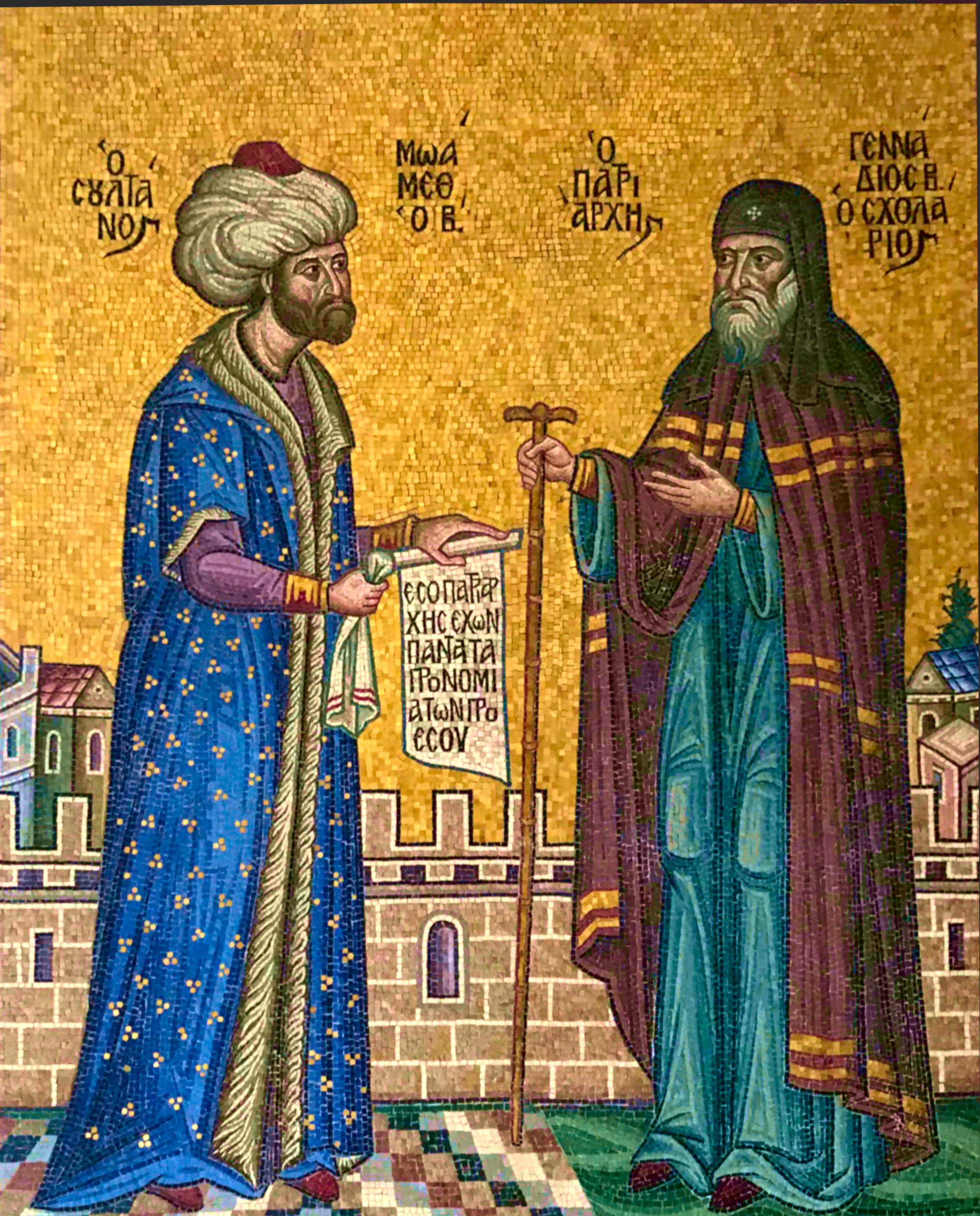
Mosaic depicting Sultan Mehmed II (left) and Patriarch Gennadios II (right)

After Mehmed II conquered Constantinople in 1453, the Ottoman sultans embraced the heritage and legacy of the Byzantine emperors and began fashioning themselves as their heirs and intended to establish a state somewhat akin to the Byzantine Empire. The Ottoman claim to Roman succession was based on the fact that the sultan now ruled what had just earlier been the Eastern Roman Empire and its populace, and possessed the imperial capital of Constantinople. In the immediate aftermath of the conquest, Mehmed proclaimed himself as kayser-i Rûm, the Roman emperor. As emperors, Mehmed and his heirs further viewed themselves as inheriting the Roman claim to universal power.

Despite assuming the title, Mehmed rarely used kayser or basileus in his official documents, neither those in Greek nor those in other languages and his official titles were instead closely modelled on those of his father, Murad II. Mehmed's most common Greek-language title was ὁ μέγας αὐθέντης καὶ μέγας ἀμηρᾶς σουλτάνος ὁ Μεχεμέτπεις ("great ruler, great emir and sultan, Mehmed"). It is possible that he did not wish to be seen merely as an imitation of the former emperors. One title that saw common usage, with clear Roman connotations, was "ruler of the two seas and the two continents". This title referred to Mehmed's claim to rule both the Black Sea and the Mediterranean, as well as both Europe and Asia. In Turkish, Arabic, and Persian, Mehmed and later sultans commonly used the titles padişah and sultan (Ottoman Turkish: پادشاه, سلطان).

Mehmed took many steps to legitimize his rule as Roman emperor. The Ottoman capital was moved to Constantinople due to its imperial history and strategic location and the city was repopulated and thrived under Mehmed and his successors. Many Greek aristocrats were promoted to elite government positions, including that of grand vizier. Similar to the Byzantine emperors, Mehmed also appointed a new Patriarch of Constantinople, Gennadios II Scholarios, which garnered the sultan further legitimacy in the eyes of his Christian subjects as well as a certain level of control over the Eastern Orthodox Church. Mehmed took steps to assimilate Greco-Roman traditions of philosophy, theology, and history, and also appropriated some Western (Roman) traditions of portrait paintings and medals. Mehmed commissioned histories of Rome and Alexander the Great, implicitly identifying the ancient rulers with his own dynasty. Byzantine political, diplomatic, and administrative practices, as well as court ceremonies, were revived and appropriated under Mehmed and his heirs. Ottoman architecture, especially imperial mosques, were heavily inspired by preceding Byzantine architecture. In 1480, Mehmed used his claim to be Roman emperor to justify an unsuccessful invasion of Italy, the intended first step in a campaign to eventually capture Rome itself. After his death, Mehmed was buried in Constantinople in 1481—in contrast to earlier sultans having been buried in Bursa—and his burial ceremony was modelled on that of Emperor Constantine I.

=== Bayezid II, Selim I, and Suleiman I (1481–1566) ===
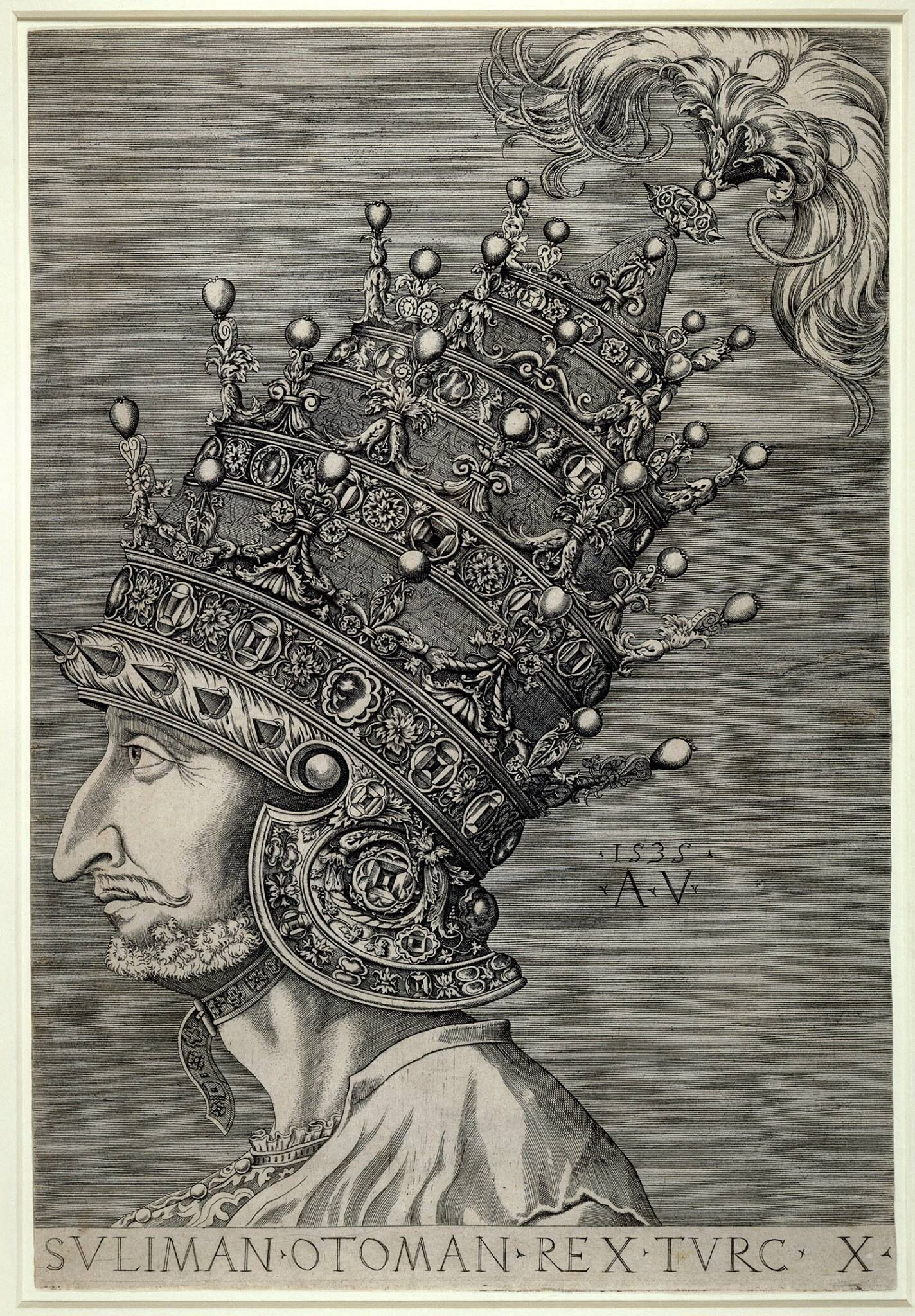
Sultan Suleiman I wearing his Venetian Helmet, a four-tiered crown designed to stress that he outranked even the pope (who wore a three-tiered crown)

The Byzantine-oriented political identity of the Ottoman Empire increased in the reigns of Mehmed II's three immediate successors Bayezid II (r. 1481–1512), Selim I (r. 1512–1520), and Suleiman I (r. 1520–1566). Protocols, court ceremonies, architecture, and symbols were increasingly borrowed from Byzantium. In terms of titulature, kayser-i Rûm became an integral part of the Ottoman imperial title (Note: As an example, Suleiman I in an inscription from Bender, Moldova used the title şeh-i Bagdad ve 'Iraq kayser-i-Rûm Mısra sultanım ("Shah of Baghdad in Iraq, Caesar of Rome and Sultan of Egypt").), tsar and basileus entered official usage, becoming the primary title used by the sultans in Serbian- and Greek-language documents respectively.

Prior to 1453, it was common for Western Europeans to refer to Byzantine emperors as "emperors of Constantinople". This title was also assumed by both Selim I and Suleiman I, rendered as padişah-i Kostantiniye (پادشاهی قسطنطنیه) in Turkish, and was sometimes extended to "Emperor of Constantinople and Trebizond". The version "Emperor of the Romans" (padişah-i Rûm) is also attested for the sultans. In Latin documents issued for diplomatic correspondence with Western European rulers, the sultans frequently used the title imperator. (Note: Imperator was used in various versions. In a 1489 peace treaty between Bayezid II and Poland, the sultan is titled as Dei gratia Asia, Grecie etc. Imperator Maximus ("by the grace of God the great emperor of Asia, Greece etc."). In a later 1494 peace, Bayezid is titled as Dei gracia Imperator ambarum terrarum, Asiae atque Europae et marium Magnus Sultanus ("by the grace of God the emperor of the two continents, Asia and Europe, and of the [two] seas, the great sultan"). A 1519 peace treaty between Selim I and Poland, written in Italian, titles the sultan as Per la Divina favente clementia Grande Imperator di Constantinopoli, di Asia, Europa, Persia, Soria et Egipto et Arabia et de li mari etc. ("by the grace of God the great emperor of Constantinople, Asia, Europe, Persia, Syria, Egypt and Arabia and the two seas etc.").)

Ottoman claims to Roman legitimacy reached their peak under Suleiman I. In the sultan's wars against the powers of Western Europe, a common battle cry of his forces was "To Rome! To Rome!" In 1537, Suleiman attacked Venetian-held Corfu and pondered invading Italy to capture Rome itself. The contemporary Italian writer Paolo Giovio believed that Suleiman thought all of Western Europe was rightfully his as the legitimate successor of Constantine I. In Constantinople, Suleiman arranged parades modelled on the triumphs of ancient Rome. The sultan also oversaw the construction of the Süleymaniye Mosque, intended to equal the splendor of the Hagia Sophia.

=== Transition to Islamic legitimacy (1566–1876) ===
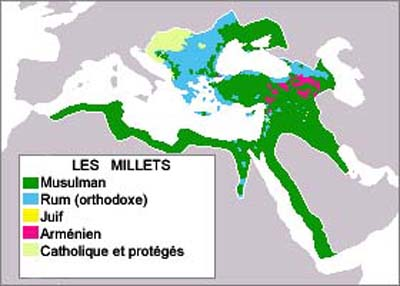
Ottoman expansion between 1481 and 1683 (top) and the distribution of the millets in the late 16th century; Christians in light blue, pink and lime green and Muslims in green (bottom)

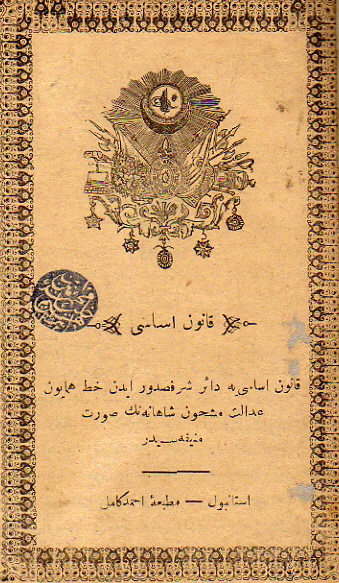
The 1876 Ottoman constitution (Kanun-i esasi). The official Greek translation established the sultan's Greek title as soultanos (σουλτάνος) and padisach (παδισαχ), rather than basileus (βασιλεύς).

Ottoman political identity rooted in continuation of, or succession from, the Byzantine Empire gradually faded away. In the early sixteenth century, the Ottomans conquered vast territories in the Levant, Arabia and North Africa, leaving the empire with a majority Muslim population. In combination with conflict against the Shia Muslim Safavid Empire in Iran, the Ottoman sultans began to more strongly stress their Sunni Islam faith and seek Islamic political legitimacy. The Ottoman sultans claimed to be caliphs since 1517, the custodian of the holy cities (Mecca and Medina), and khan or khagan alongside other titles from Turkic, Persian, Central Asian and Islamic traditions. Christian and Greco-Roman ideas of legitimacy could not be dropped completely since a large number of Christians continued to live within the empire. The sultans also had to continue to deal with foreign Christian monarchs.

In 1525, the Ottoman court ceased to issue official documents in scripts other than Arabic, a further step towards Islamic political identity. Translations of official documents continued to be made and issued by lower officials and governors, and for diplomatic purposes, though these did not carry the tughra (the sultan's signature). This meant that titles such as basileus and imperator ceased to be used officially by the sultans themselves, who instead mostly used only sultan and/or padişah. The sultans continued to deny other monarchs the style of padişah in diplomatic correspondence, which meant that the implications of their imperial role was not forgotten. Ottoman sultans after Suleiman I at times still stressed that they were Roman emperors (Note: Ahmed I (r. 1603–1607) referred to himself as sahib-kıran-i memalik-i-Rûm ve 'Acem ve 'Arab ("the lord of the fortunate conjunction of the Roman, Persian and Arab kingdoms"). Mehmed IV (r. 1648–1687) used the style ferman-ferma-yi memalik-i-Rûm ve 'Arab ve 'Acem ("the one who issues orders to the Roman, Arab and Persian kingdoms").) and the style kayser or kayser-i Rûm remained in use as late as the eighteenth century. Greek-language translations of official Ottoman documents continued to style the sultans as basileus until 1876, when the Ottoman constitution (Kanun-i esasi) was officially translated into Greek and established that the terms sultan (σουλτάνος, soultanos) and padişah (παδισαχ, padisach) were to be used.

The Ottomans did not object when Vasili III of Russia stopped referring to the Sultan as tsar (the Slavic imperial title) as they preferred the caliph title. Halil İnalcık argues that sar or çar did not mean "Caesar" to the Ottomans. In 1562, the Patriarch of Constantinople recognized the Russian sovereigns as tsars. The Ottoman sultans had to concede Holy Roman Emperors were imperators in 1606 and later the Russian Emperors in 1741, by then imperator lost its association to the Ottoman sultans. In the Treaty of Küçük Kaynarca (1774), the Russian Empire had to recognize the Ottoman Caliphate because Islamic legitimacy became more important. In the nineteenth century, Ottoman sultans resumed using imperator in international diplomacy. At this time, the title no longer reflected a claim superiority and to be Roman emperors. Instead, imperator indicated the wish of the sultans for equal recognition among the other rulers of Europe. By this point, numerous other European monarchs had begun to refer to themselves as emperors, including not only the German and Austrian emperors, but also the rulers of France, Russia and Britain.

== Ottoman–Roman identity ==
Contemporaries in Western Europe overwhelmingly referred to the Ottoman Empire as "Turkish" and its inhabitants as "Turks", though this was not an identity adopted by the empire itself or its populace. Early sultans at times emphasized descent from the Oghuz Turks, though this rapidly faded away once sultans began to claim the inheritance of the Greco-Roman world. Among sultans and the general populace, "Turk" and "Turkish" became derogatory terms, used by the imperial elite for nomadic Turkic peoples and the Turkish-speaking peasants in Anatolia. The Muslim inhabitants of Constantinople would have regarded the term "Turk" as insulting. In the early modern period, many Ottoman Turks, especially those who lived in cities and were not part of the military or administration, self-identified as Romans (Rūmī, رومى), as inhabitants of former Byzantine territory. This term began to fall out of use at the end of the seventeenth century. The term instead became restricted to only refer to the Greek population of the empire.

The Ottoman state never officially used the term "Ottoman Empire" domestically. The term derives from the nineteenth-century French name l’Empire Ottoman, which was used in international diplomacy, though there was no corresponding concept within the empire itself. Different aspects of the state, people, and territory were termed Devlet-i Âliyye-i Osmaniye ("the Exalted Ottoman State/Dynasty"), Âl-i Osman ("the Family/Dynasty of Osman"), tebaa ("the subjects/flock") and Memâlik-i Mahrûse ("the Well-Protected Domains"). In earlier centuries, several names used for the Ottoman state reflected its assumption of Roman heritage. The Ottoman historian Mustafa Ali, in his 1581 work Nuṣḥatü's-selāṭīn ("counsel for sultans"), uses several terms for the empire, including memalik-i Osmaniye ("Ottoman realms"), âl-i Osman, diyar-i Rûm ("lands of Rome"), memalik-i Rum ("Roman realms"), milket-i Osman ("attributes of Osman") and just Rûm ("Rome").

== Contemporary recognition ==
=== Domestic recognition ===
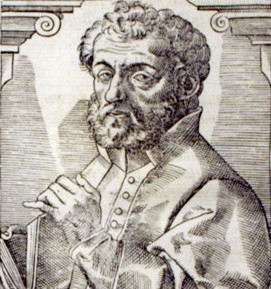
George of Trebizond, one of the 15th-century Greek historians supportive of the Ottoman sultans as Roman emperors

In the imperial ideology of the Byzantine Empire, possession of Constantinople was the key legitimizing factor for an emperor. Rulers who did not control the city but claimed to be emperors were generally seen as acting unnaturally. Given that the Ottomans could be seen as having obtained Constantinople through the right of conquest, much of the Christian populace of both Constantinople and the wider Ottoman Empire saw Mehmed II as the legitimate new Roman emperor from 1453 onwards. Through its assumption of Byzantine heritage, the Christian populace of the Ottoman Empire did thus not consider the new empire to be a completely new state. It was however also impossible to consider the Ottoman Empire to be a seamless continuation of the Byzantine Empire, since the latter had far too deep theological roots to be compatible with a foreign Muslim ruler. The general view was that the Ottomans inherited the political legitimacy and right to rule of the Byzantine Empire, though not the former empire's other theological implications.

Ottoman sultans were sometimes, albeit rarely, referred to as basileus by Greek writers, significant since Byzantine historians never applied this term to usurpers or illegitimate rulers, who were instead referred to as "tyrants". The Ecumenical Patriarchate of Constantinople had officially recognized Mehmed II as basileus by 1474, as a synodal register from that year applies this title to the sultan. Byzantine refugees who fled after the fall of Constantinople, such as Doukas and Bessarion, generally held that the Ottomans were infidels, barbarians, and illegitimate tyrants. Some Greek historians promoted the idea that Ottoman rule was illegitimate but nevertheless divinely ordained to punish the sins of the Byzantine populace; one theological explanation for Constantinople's fall was that the sultans had been sent by God to safeguard the people against the attempts by the last few Palaiologoi emperors of reunifying the Eastern Orthodox Church with the Catholic Church.

A handful of Greek historians aligned with the Ottoman regime, such as George of Trebizond, Michael Critobulus, and George Amiroutzes, explicitly referred to the sultans as basileus. In the mind of George of Trebizond, it was the possession of Constantinople that made Mehmed the legitimate Roman emperor:

No one can doubt that he is emperor of the Romans. He who holds the seat of empire in his hand is emperor of right; and Constantinople is the center of the Roman Empire.

=== International recognition ===
==== Christian Europe ====
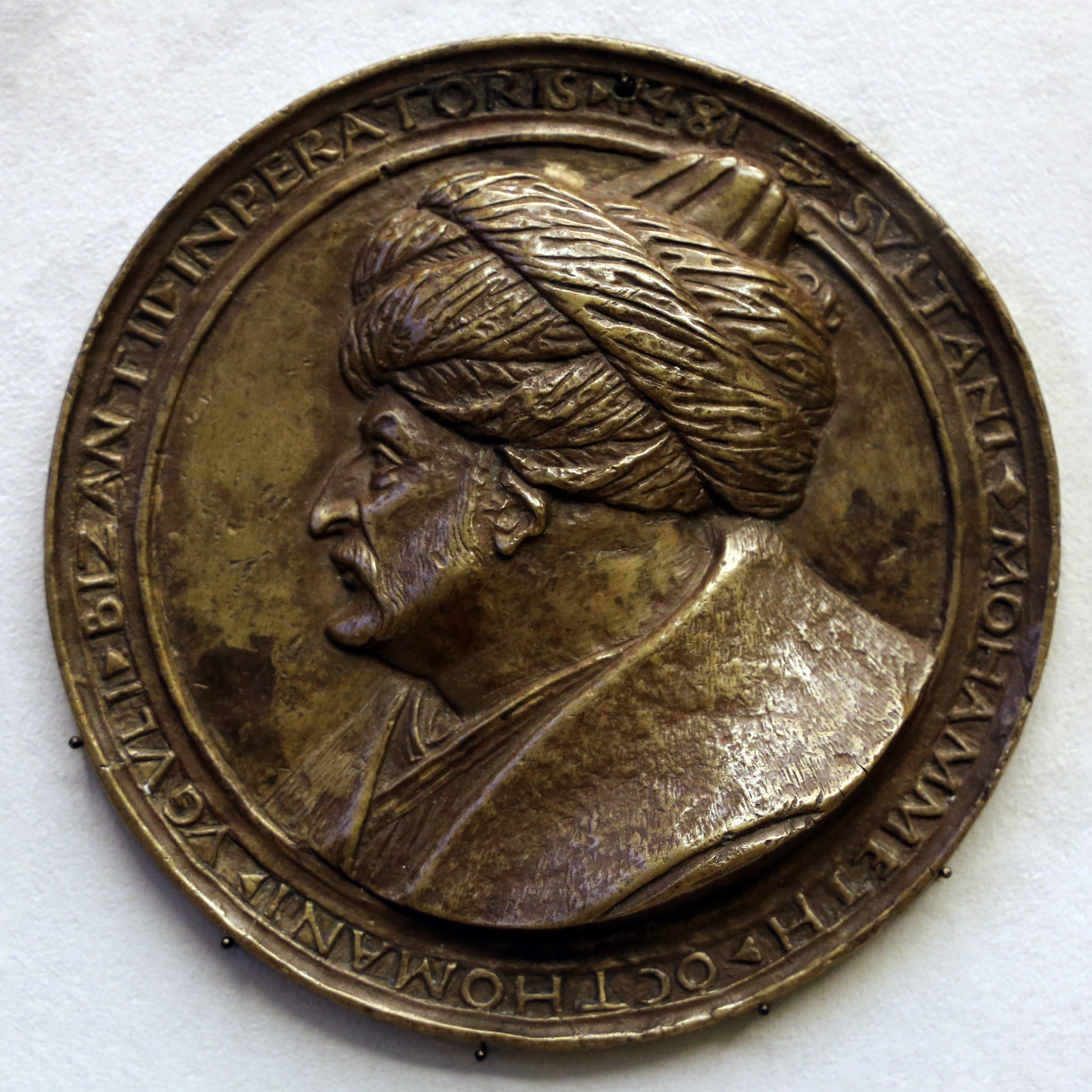
1482 medallion by Costanzo da Ferrara depicting Mehmed II. The titles used include both "sultan" (sultani) and "Byzantine emperor" (Bizantii inperatoris).

In Western Europe, the Ottoman sultan was commonly designated as the "Eastern emperor" or "Turkish emperor", terms that suggest an inherent understanding of the Ottoman Empire as an heir to the former Byzantine Empire. In the Holy Roman Empire türkischer Kaiser ("Turkish Emperor") became common while in Italy and the Papal States Turcus ("Turk"), Magnus Turcus ("Great Turk") or Turcorum Tyrannus ("Turkish Tyrant") were more prominent and avoided the term emperor at the start. In 1496 and 1497, Maximilian I met an Ottoman delegation in Vigevano and in Stams. During the meetings, Maximilian I accepted the Imperial title used for the sultan and called him Turc-emperor privately. Maximilian I even hosted an imposter pretender Calixtus Ottomanus who was called "Turkish emperor" by both Maximilian I and himself. The Holy Roman emperors themselves maintained that they were the successors of the ancient Roman emperors up until the abdication of Francis II, the final Holy Roman emperor, in 1806. The general approach by Western Europeans was to view the Ottoman sultans as emperors, but not Roman emperors, the same approach previously used for the Byzantine emperors.

The significance placed by the sultans on the idea of being heirs of the Byzantine emperors was well known in the West. In the 1460s, Pope Pius II went so far as to encourage Mehmed II to convert to Christianity so that the power and legitimacy of the Byzantine crown could be fully transferred to the sultan. Whether the sultans were viewed as legitimate successors of the Byzantine emperors varied. At least some writers saw the sultans in that way; as an example, Cyriacus of Ancona referred to Mehmed II as the new emperor in Constantinople and recognized him as inheriting the imperial legacy of the Byzantine emperors. A handful of Western European sources explicitly connected the Ottomans to the Romans; sixteenth-century Portuguese sources for instance refer to the Ottomans they battled in the Indian Ocean as rumes. Johannes Cuspinian, who served under Maximilian I lists Ottoman sultans alongside Holy Roman and Byzantine emperors from the Antiquity in his book Caesares.

The Ottoman claim to be Roman emperors was challenged by the rulers of the Holy Roman Empire, long opposed to the preceding Byzantines, as well as the Russian Empire, which as the strongest remaining Eastern Orthodox state also claimed Byzantine inheritance. While Grand Prince Ivan III called the Sultan a tsar, Grand Prince Vasili III of Russia stopped the usage for Selim I. Tsar does not necessarily mean "Roman Emperor" as they had been using the title for Tatar khans too. By the sixteenth and seventeenth century, there does not appear to have been widespread support for either claim among other states in Western Europe. The Ottoman sultans regarded few foreign monarchs as their equals, a development stemming from their claim to emperorship and universal rule. Holy Roman emperors were typically referred to by the Ottomans as "kings of Vienna" and requests from monarchs to be treated as equals were either ignored or rejected.

In the 1533 Treaty of Constantinople between Sultan Suleiman I and Holy Roman Emperor Charles V, only the Ottoman sultan was titled as emperor and Suleiman saw himself as having wrestled the title of Roman emperor from his rival. In the 1606 Peace of Zsitvatorok, Sultan Ahmed I was forced to concede that the Holy Roman Emperor Rudolf II was an imperator. Although a symbolic victory for Rudolf, the treaty did not establish the two rulers as equals since Ahmed continued to reserve the titles kayser and padişah solely for himself. Roman-German Emperor Charles VI considered using his potential claim to the Byzantine throne through Andreas Palaiologos's last will against the Ottomans but the expected success by Prince Eugene of Savoy did not came to fruition. Russian Empress Elizabeth I was recognized to be an imperator in 1741 and in the Treaty of Küçük Kaynarca of 1774, the Russian Emperors were recognized to be padişahs and later saw themselves as the protectors of the Orthodox Christians and eventually proposed the creation of a new Byzantine Empire with the Greek Plan. Even during World War I, Russia had interest in Constantinople which was promised to them as part of the Constantinople Agreement.

==== The Islamic world ====
In the Islamic world, the Ottomans were widely recognized as Romans. Early Arab sources refer to the Ottomans as atrak ("Turks"), though this term was later replaced with rumi (plural arwam), and the geographical name Rum came to mean both Anatolia and the Balkan territories under control of the Ottoman Empire. Especially in the sixteenth through eighteenth centuries, Ottoman administrators in Egypt and Arabia are almost always referred to by contemporary Arab writers as arwam. The use of rumi was not without ambiguity. The term was used for those in the service of the sultan, even if said person was not ethnically Turkish. Furthermore, rumi also continued to be used for Orthodox Christians, especially those who spoke Greek. In the eighteenth century, the more specific term uthmani came into general use for Ottoman officials.

Ottoman sultans were often referred to as Roman emperors by other Muslim rulers. Several documents from the Mughal Empire title the Ottoman sultan as the Qaiser-i-Rum, Sultan-i-Rum ("Sultan of Rome"), or Khawandkar-i-Rum ("Lord of Rome"). In the history of the Persian chronicler Firishta (c. 1570–1620), the Ottoman sultan is referred to as the Sultan-i-Rum and Khunkar-i-Rum ("Lord of Rome").

==== China ====
Contemporary Chinese sources used various names for the classical Roman Empire and the medieval Byzantine Empire, including Daqin, Lijian, Likxuan, Liqian, Folang, and Fulang. Similar to the Chinese concept of dynasties, Chinese sources considered the Roman Empire to have become the Byzantine Empire without essential change, the continuity of the empire withstanding changes in ruling dynasty, culture, and imperial capital. In sources from the Chinese Ming dynasty (1368–1644), the Ottomans were also connected to the Romans. The Ottomans were referred to as Lumi (魯迷), a transliteration of Rūmī, and Constantinople was called Lumi cheng (魯迷城, "Lumi city", i.e. "Roman city").

== See also ==
- Hellenoturkism
- Ottoman Caliphate
- Succession of the Roman Empire
- Succession to the Byzantine Empire
