= Bursa Archaeological Museum =

- Bursa Arkeoloji Müzesi
- Location of Bursa Archaeological Museum in Turkey
- Established: 1972; 54 years ago
- Location: Çekirge, Bursa, Bursa Province
- Coordinates: 40°11′45″N 29°02′28″E
- Type: Archaeology museum

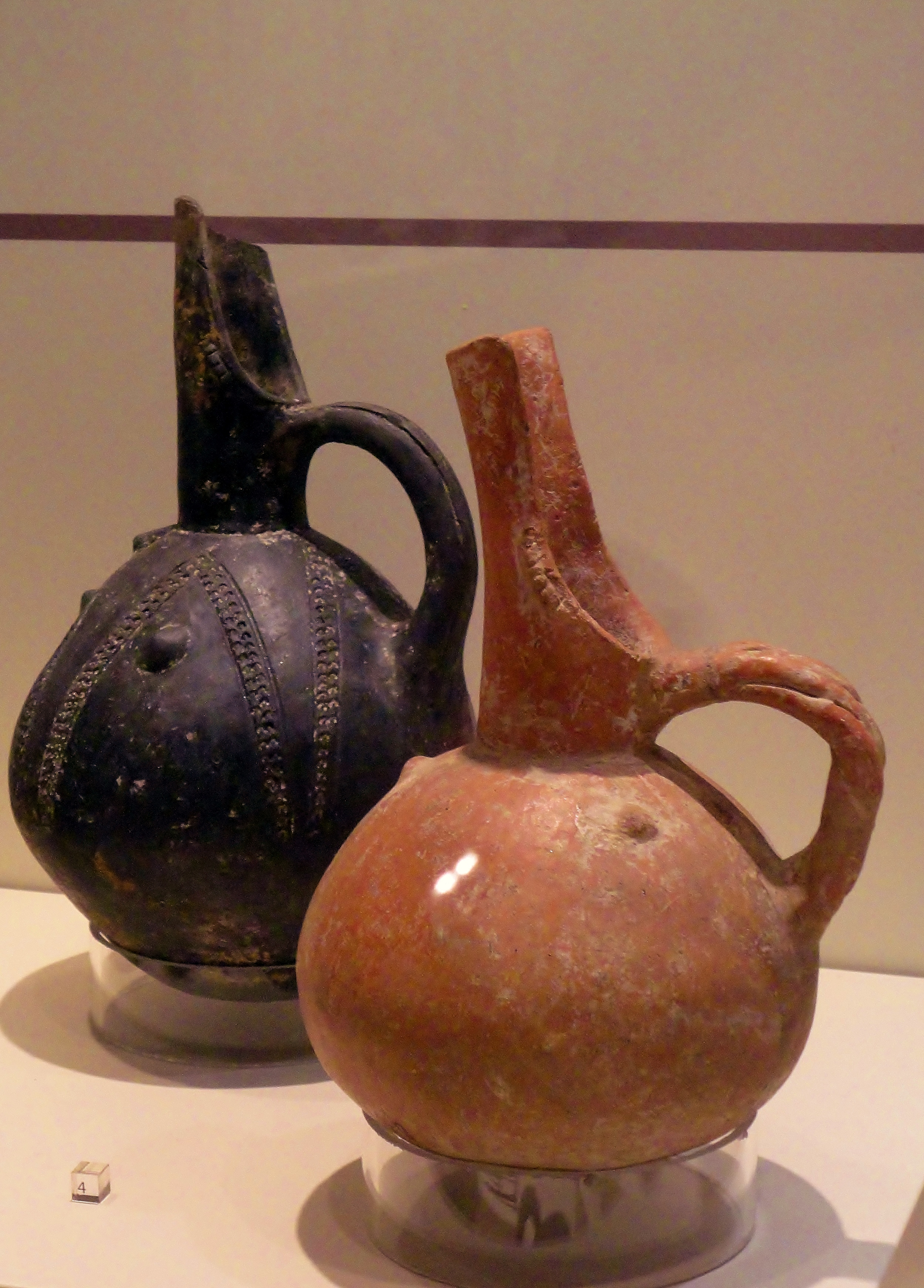
Ancient pottery in the museum.

Bursa Archaeological Museum (Note: Turkish: Bursa Arkeoloji Müzesi) is an archaeological museum in Bursa, Turkey. It exhibits various archaeological artifacts that originated from the Middle Miocene Period up to the end of the Byzantine Era that were found in and around Bursa.

== History ==
Bursa Archaeological Museum was opened in 1972 at the Bursa Kültürpark as a separated unit and extension of the Archaeology section of the Bursa Museum. The archaeological museum was closed temporarily for restoration in 2010 and was reopened in 2013.

== Gallery ==
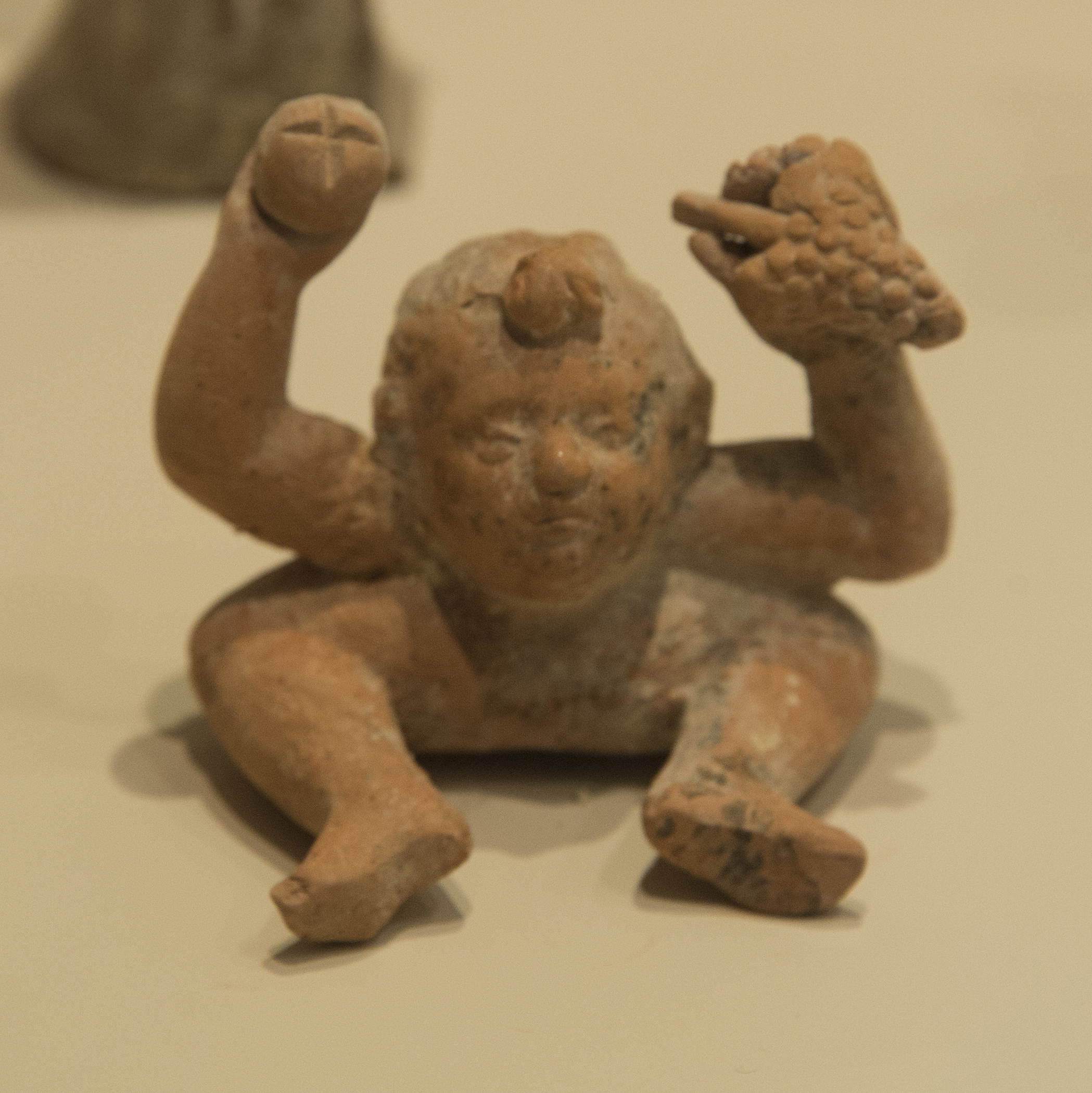
Hellenistic figurine

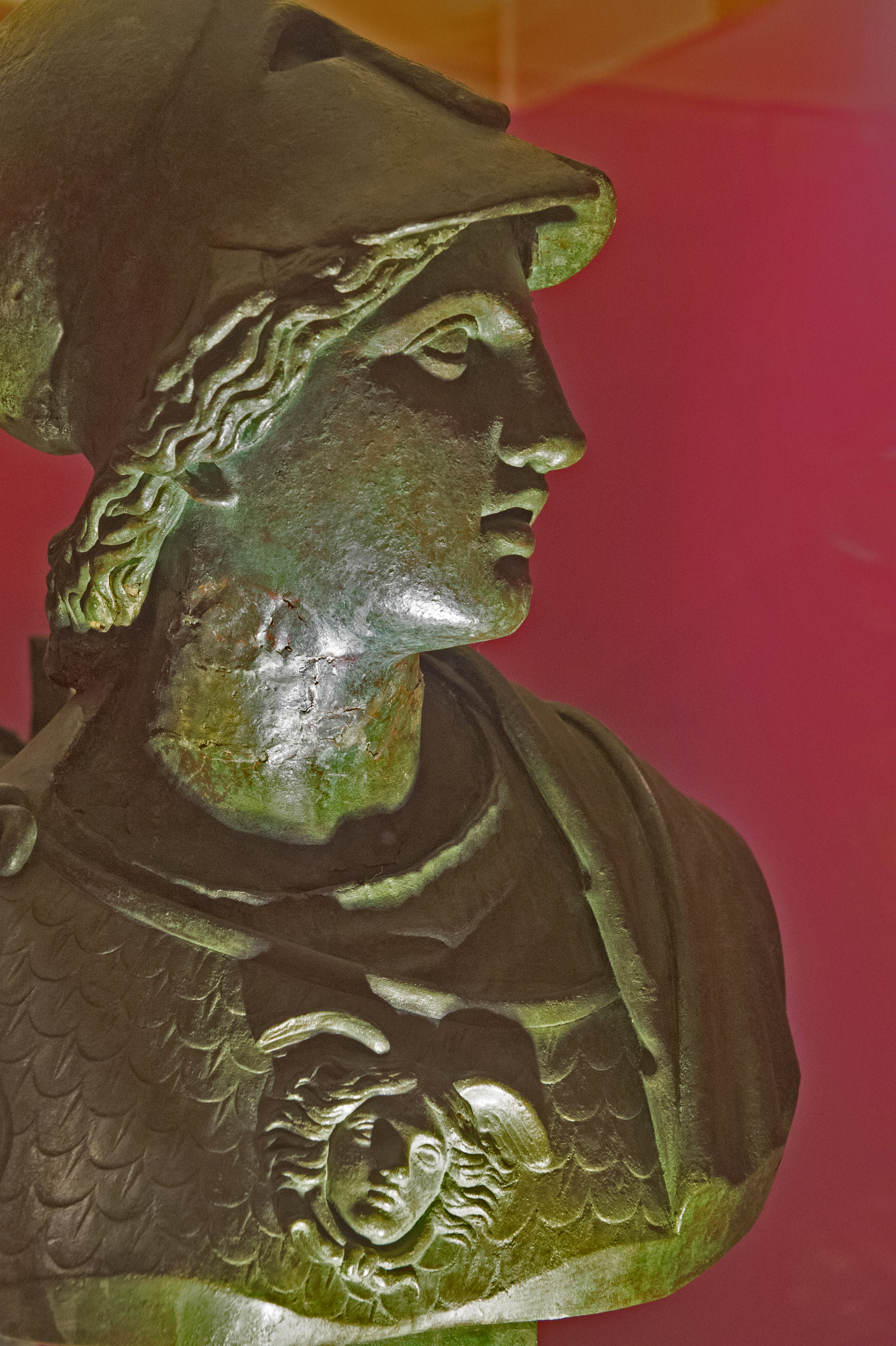
Athena, bronze, 2nd century AD

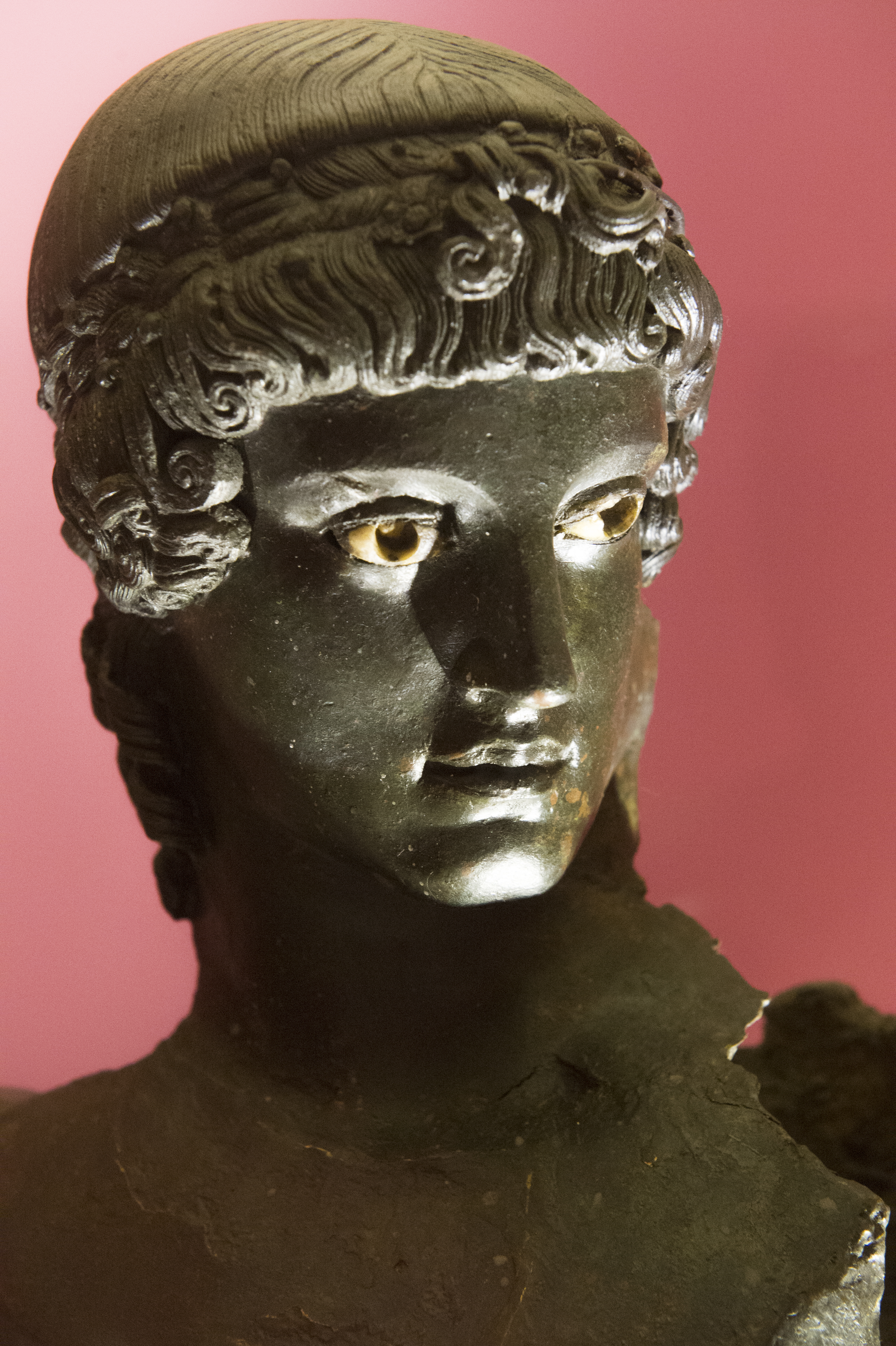
Apollo, bronze, 2nd century AD

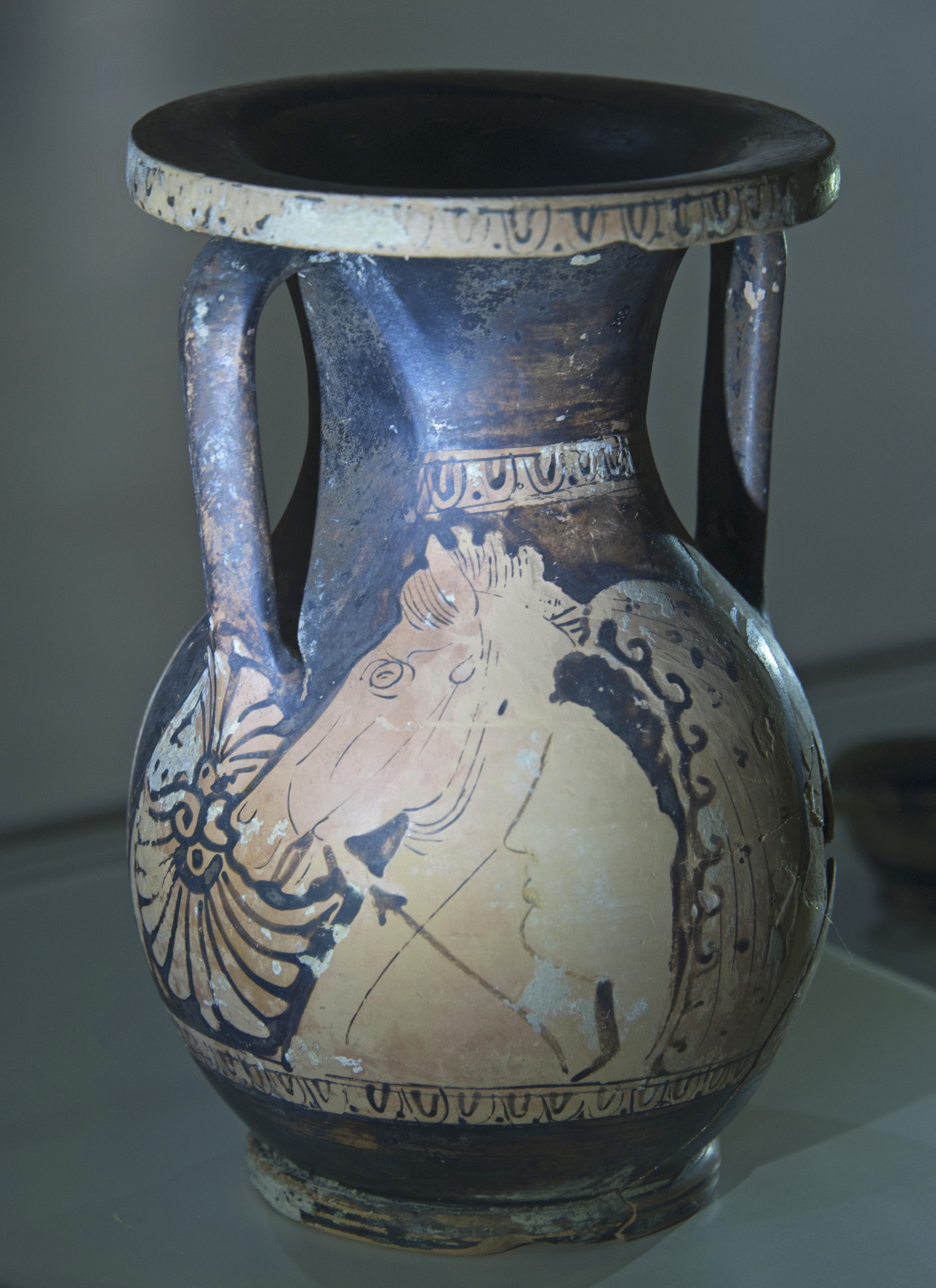
A vase from the Antanderos excavations

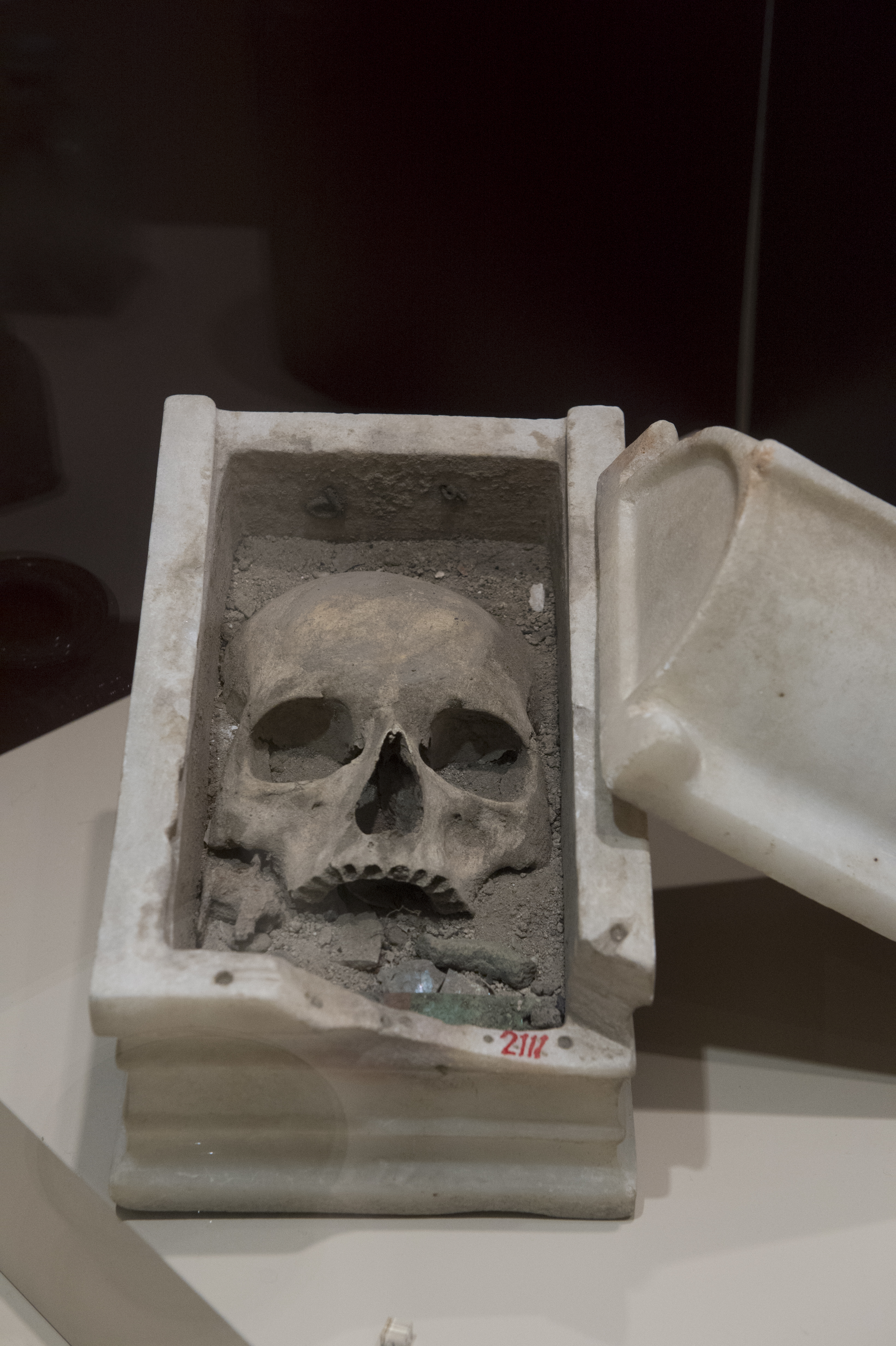
Reliquary Byzantine, 330-1453

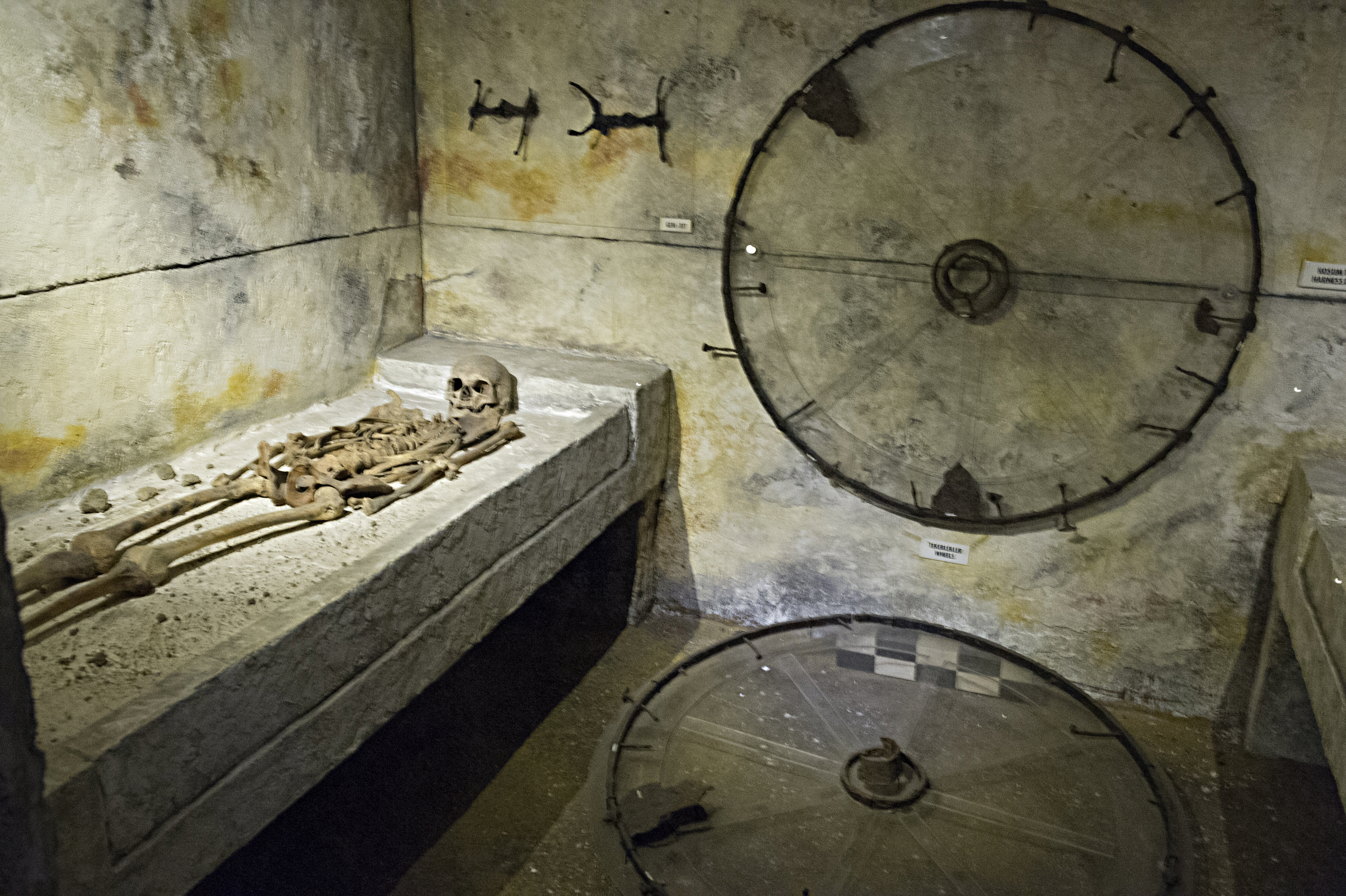
Reconstructed burial site

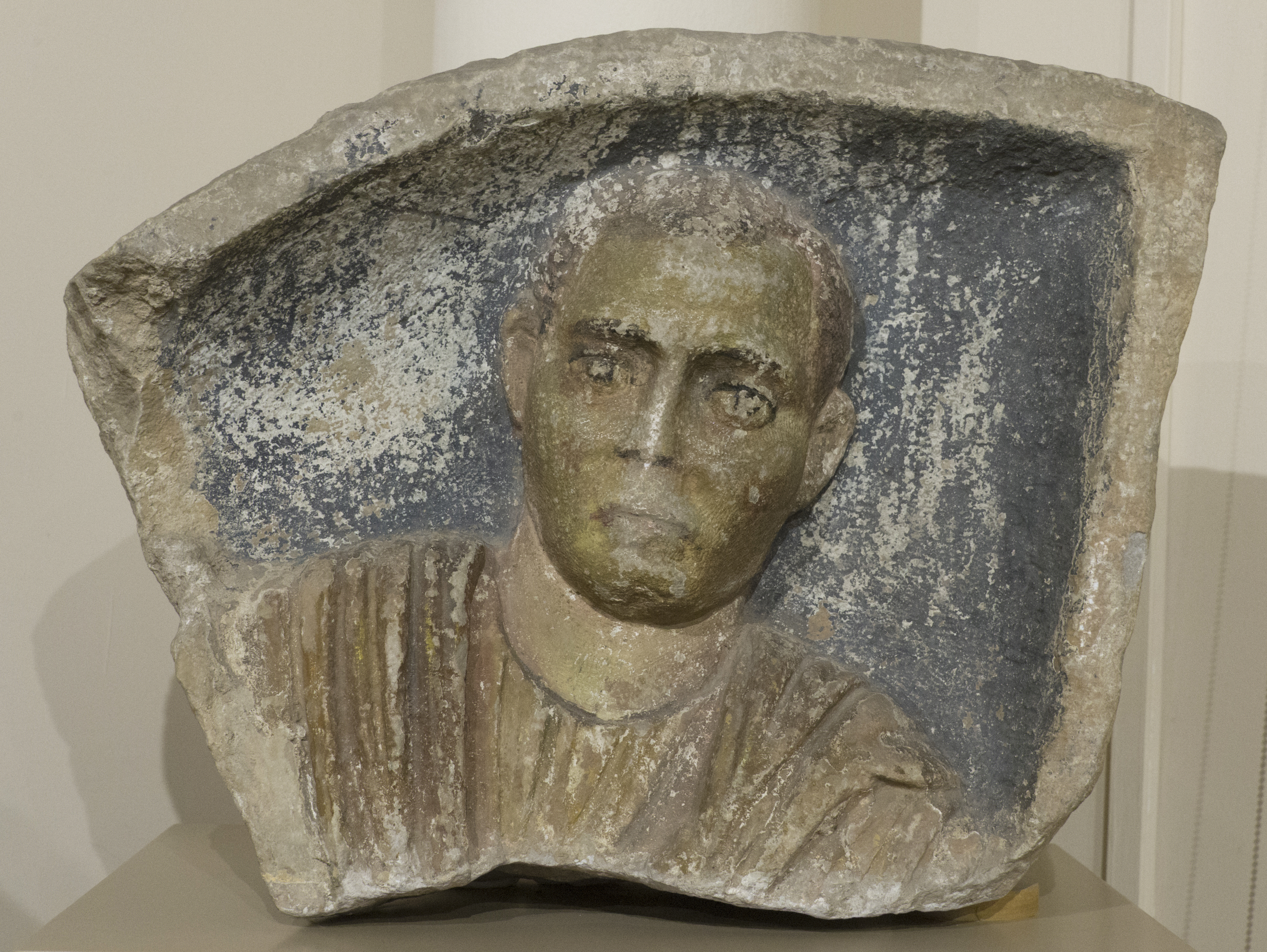
Painted gravestone

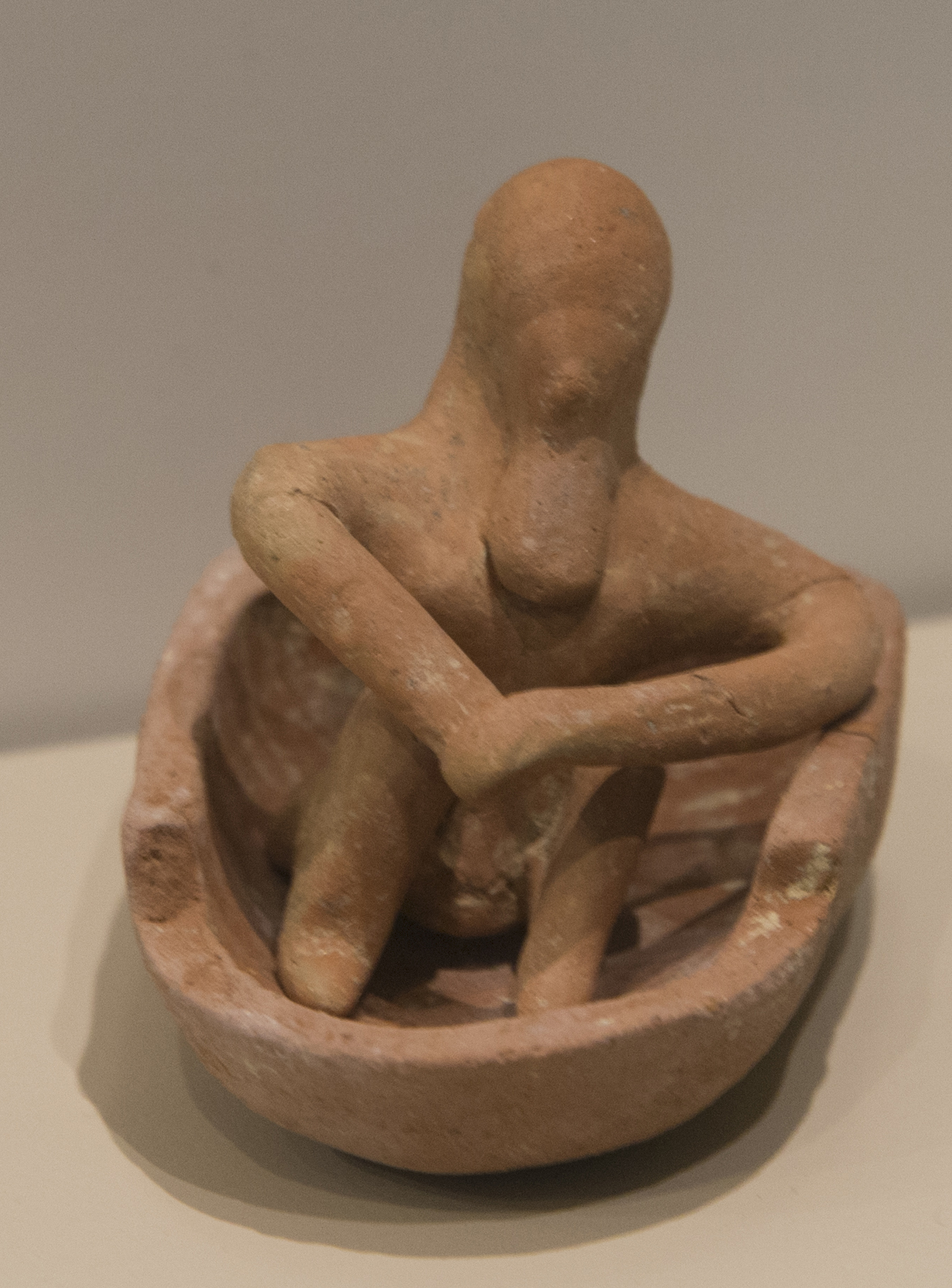
Archaic figurine

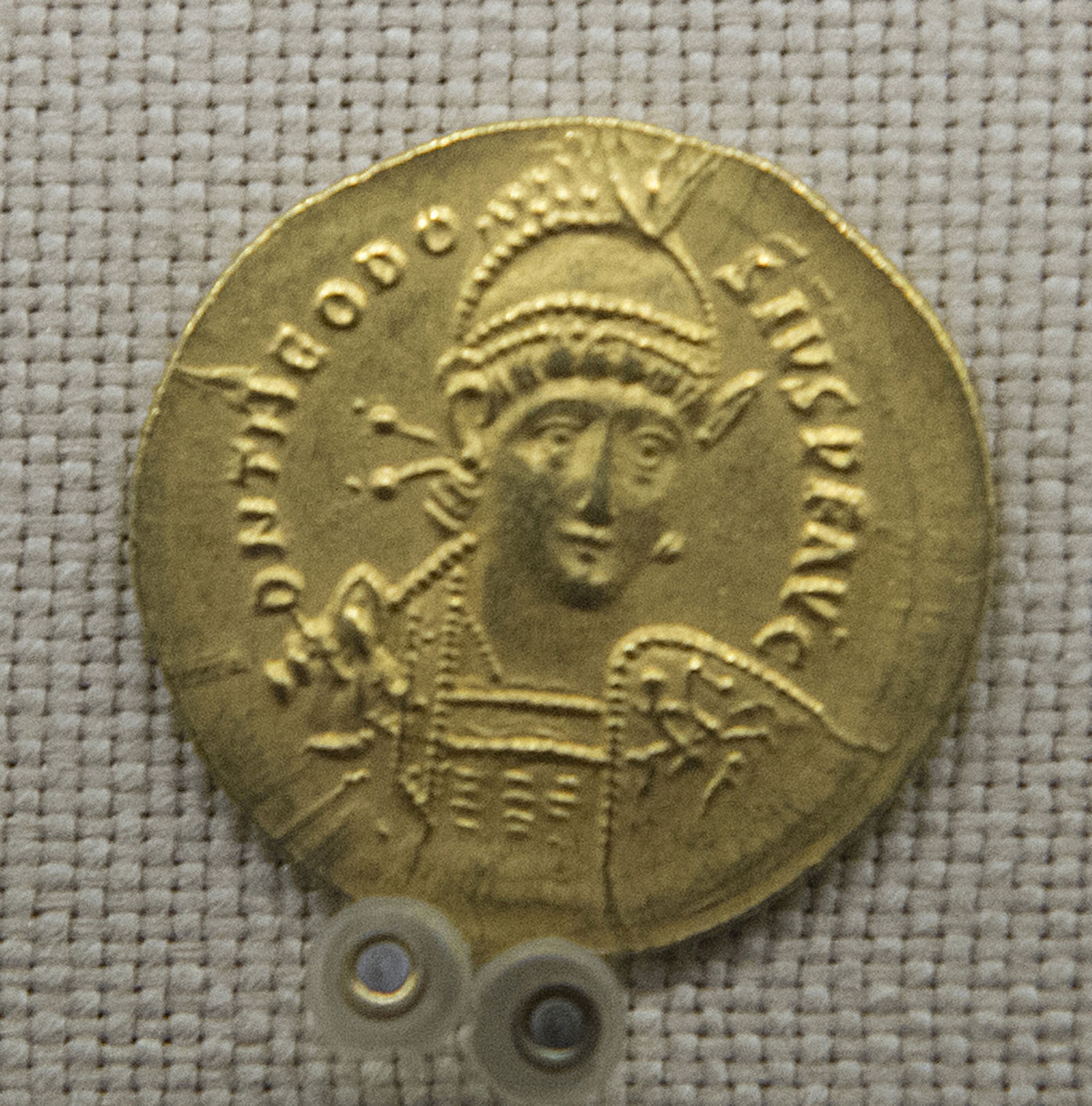
Theodosius II coin, 402-450 AD

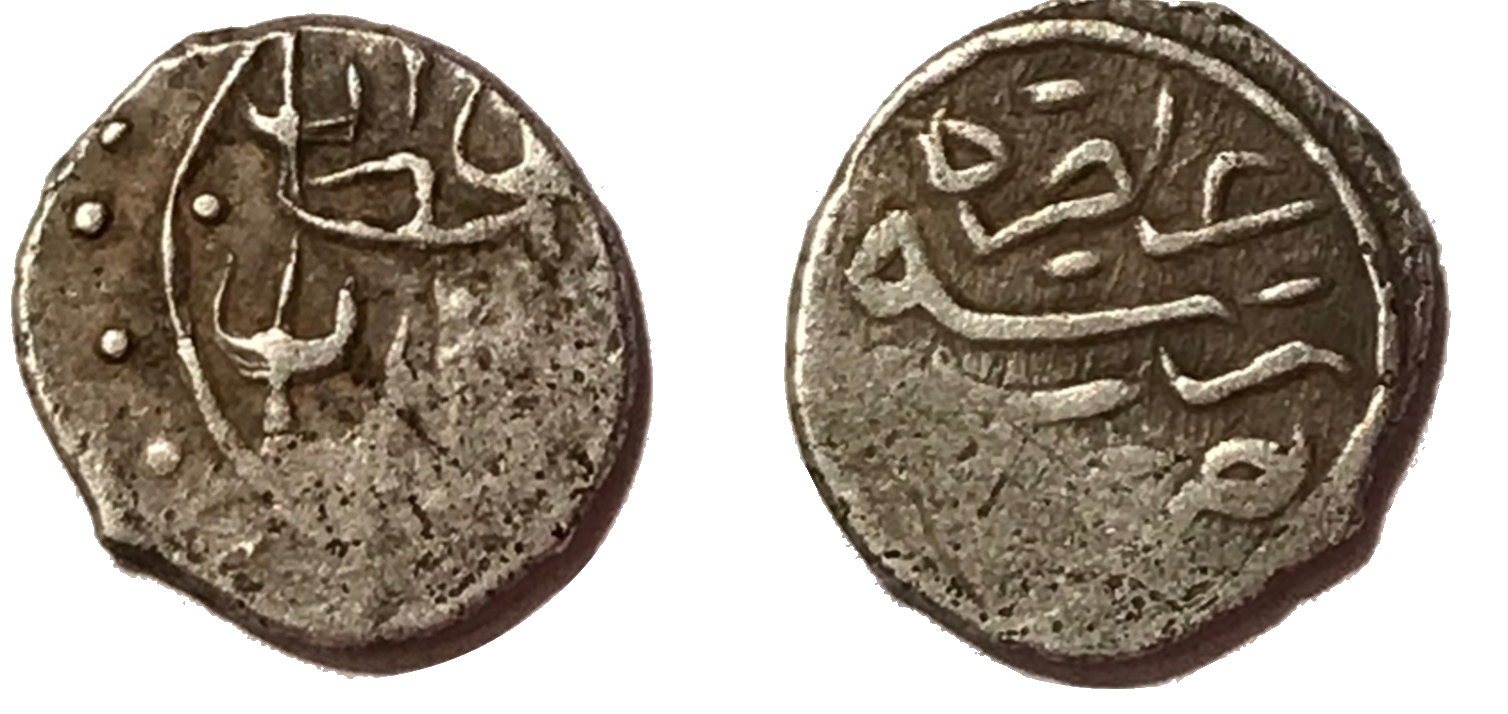
1481 dated akçe minted by Cem. On the obverse: "Sultan Cem son of Mehmed Khan" and on the reverse: "May his victory be glorious. Struck in Bursa, year 886 [AH]"
