= Costanzo da Ferrara =

Italian painter

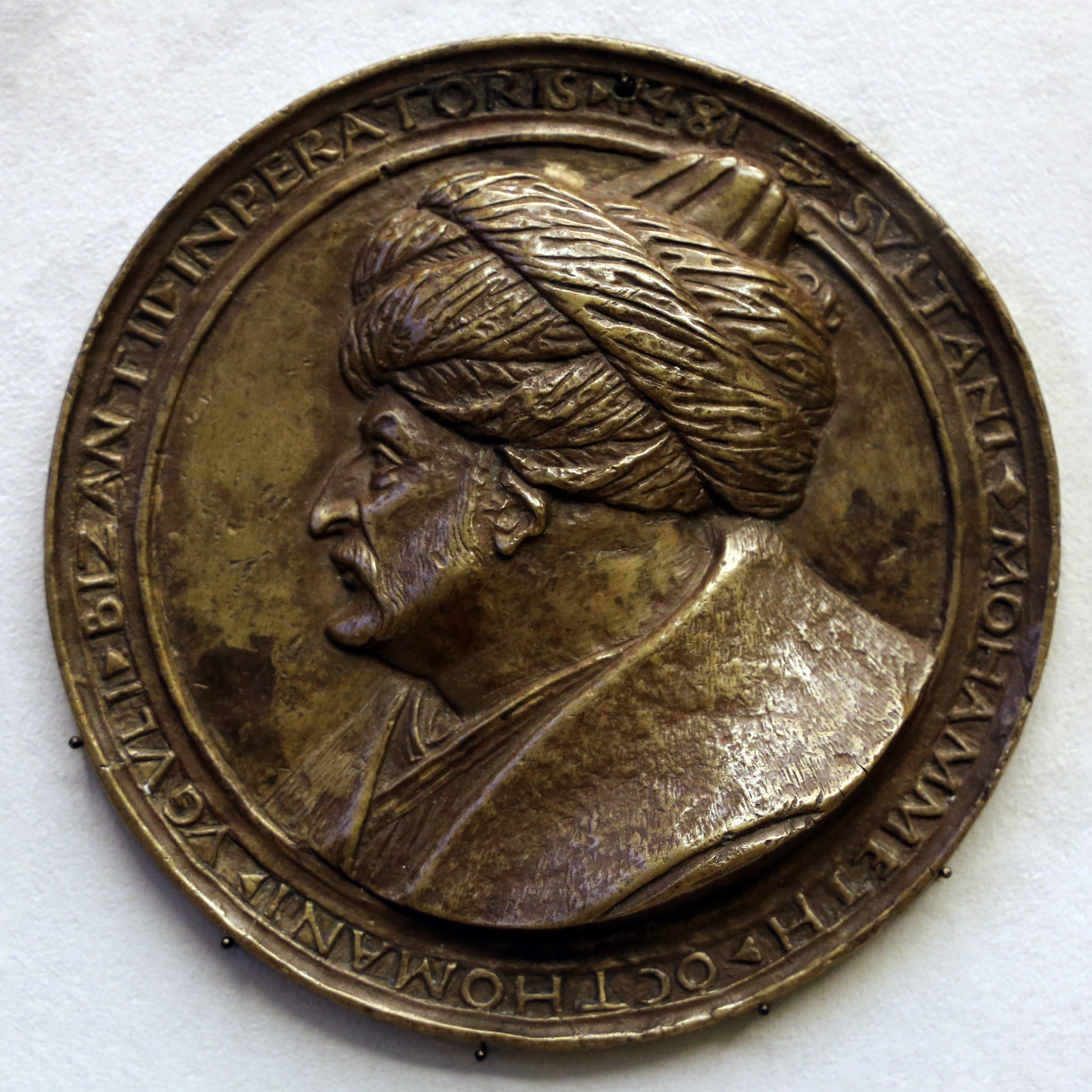
Second medal of the sultan Mehmet II, with mention "Byzantii Imperatoris 1481", made by Costanzo da Ferrara (1450-1524).

Costanzo da Ferrara (1450–1524) was an Italian painter and medalist, born in Ferrara, but working mainly in Naples.

Costanzo was asked to go to Constantinople, capital of the Ottoman Empire, to make a portrait of the sultan Mehmet II. Diplomatic relations were restored with the Ottoman Empire after the Ottoman offensive on Negroponte in 1470. At that point, the sultan asked for "uno pittore de quelli dal canto di qua" (a painter from over here). Ferdinand I of Naples (1423–1494), recognizing the Ottoman ruler, commissioned the work.

Costanzo da Ferrara probably resided in Istanbul during the period 1475 to 1478, and may have remained there until the death of the Sultan in 1481. Two medals were minted in the name of the Sultan, one with "Asie et Gretie imperator", the other with "Bizantii imperator".

Costanzo da Ferrara is also known to have been back in Naples in 1485, where he painted a portrait of Ferdinando d'Este. Some paintings attributed to Gentile Bellini in Constantinople, may actually have been made by Costanzo da Ferrara.

== Gallery ==
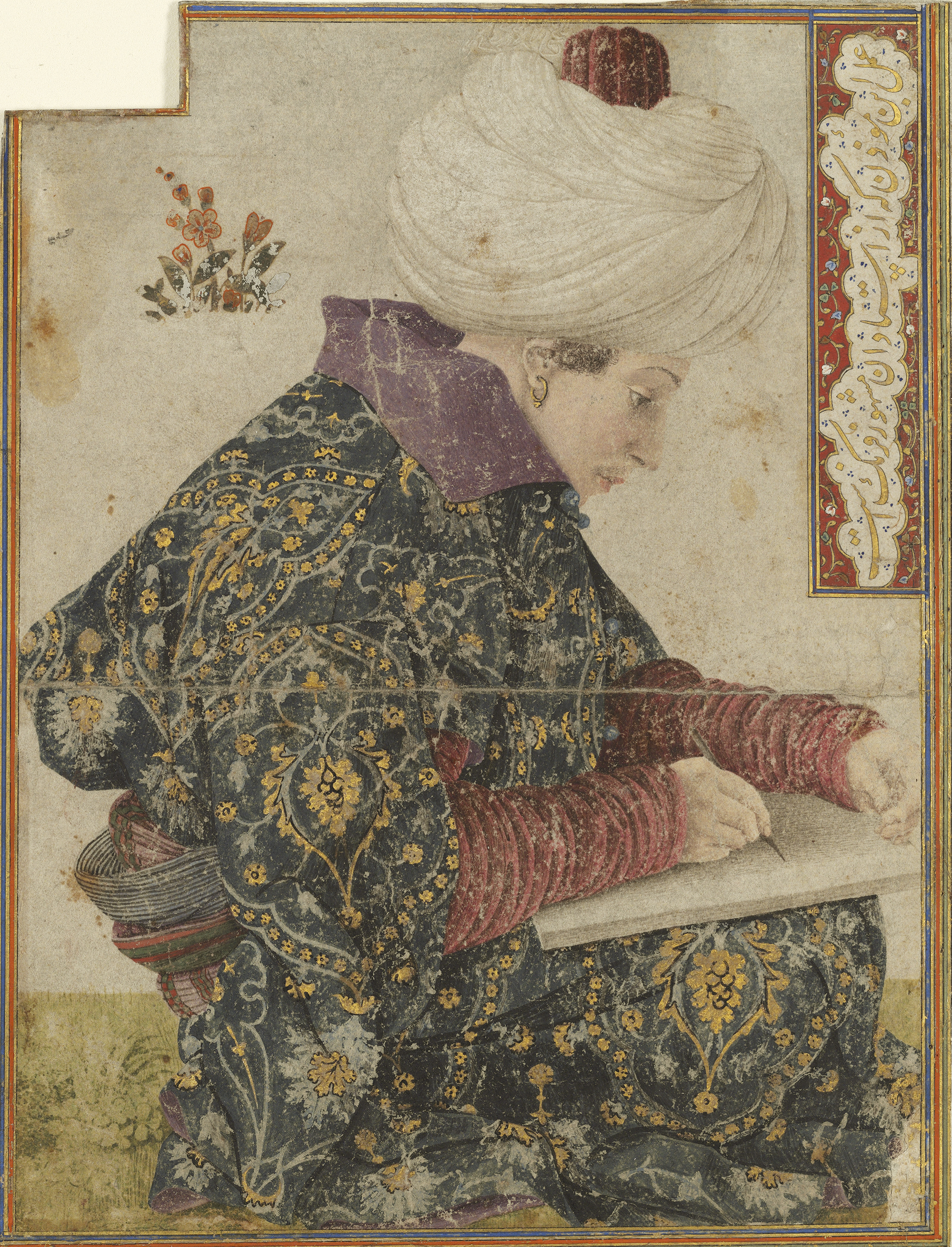
The seated scribe, traditionally attributed to Gentile Bellini, may actually have been painted by Costanzo da Ferrara.

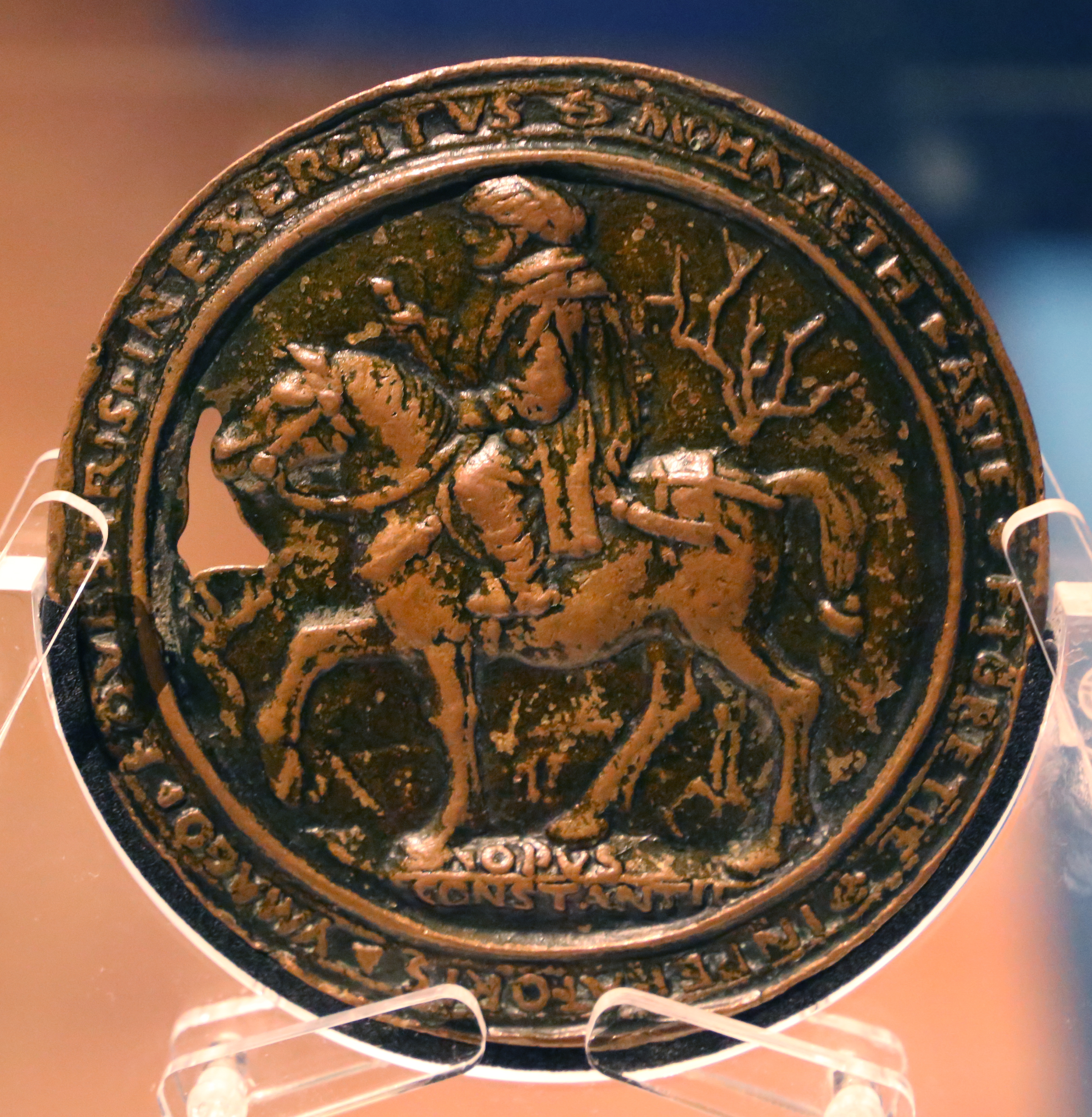
Reverse of the second Mehmet II medal by Costanzo da Ferrara

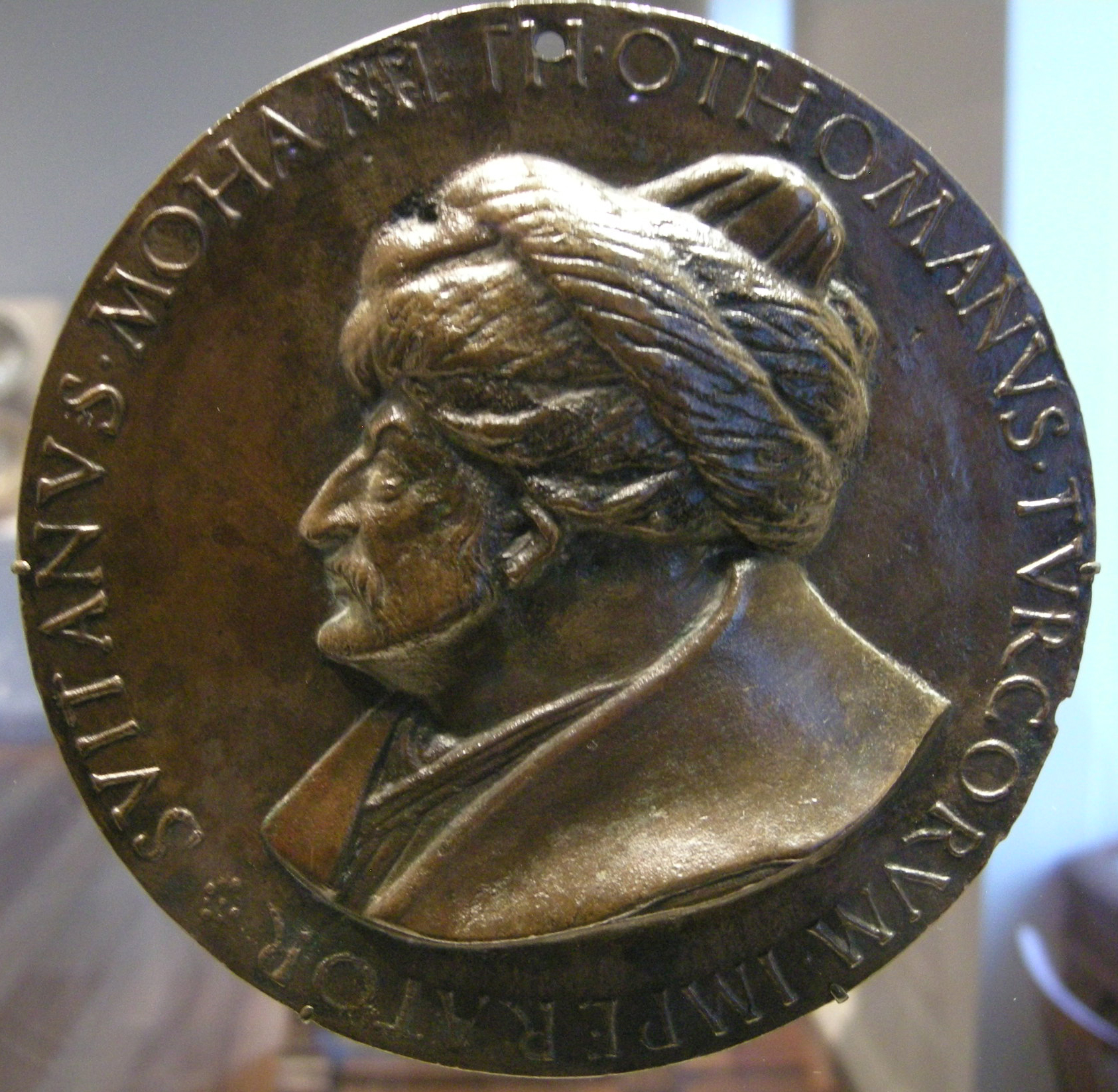
First medal of Mehmet II, by Costanzo da Ferrara, circa 1478.
