= Dead Christ Supported by Two Angels =

Dead Christ Supported by Two Angels may refer to:

- Dead Christ Supported by Two Angels (Bellini, Berlin), a painting by Giovanni Bellini housed in the Gemäldegalerie, Berlin
- Dead Christ Supported by Two Angels (Bellini, Venice), a painting by Giovanni Bellini housed in the Museo Correr, Venice

== See also ==
- Dead Christ Supported by Angels (Bellini, Rimini), another painting by Bellini, now in the city museum of Rimini
