= Madonna and Child Blessing (Bellini, Venice) =

Painting by Giovanni Bellini

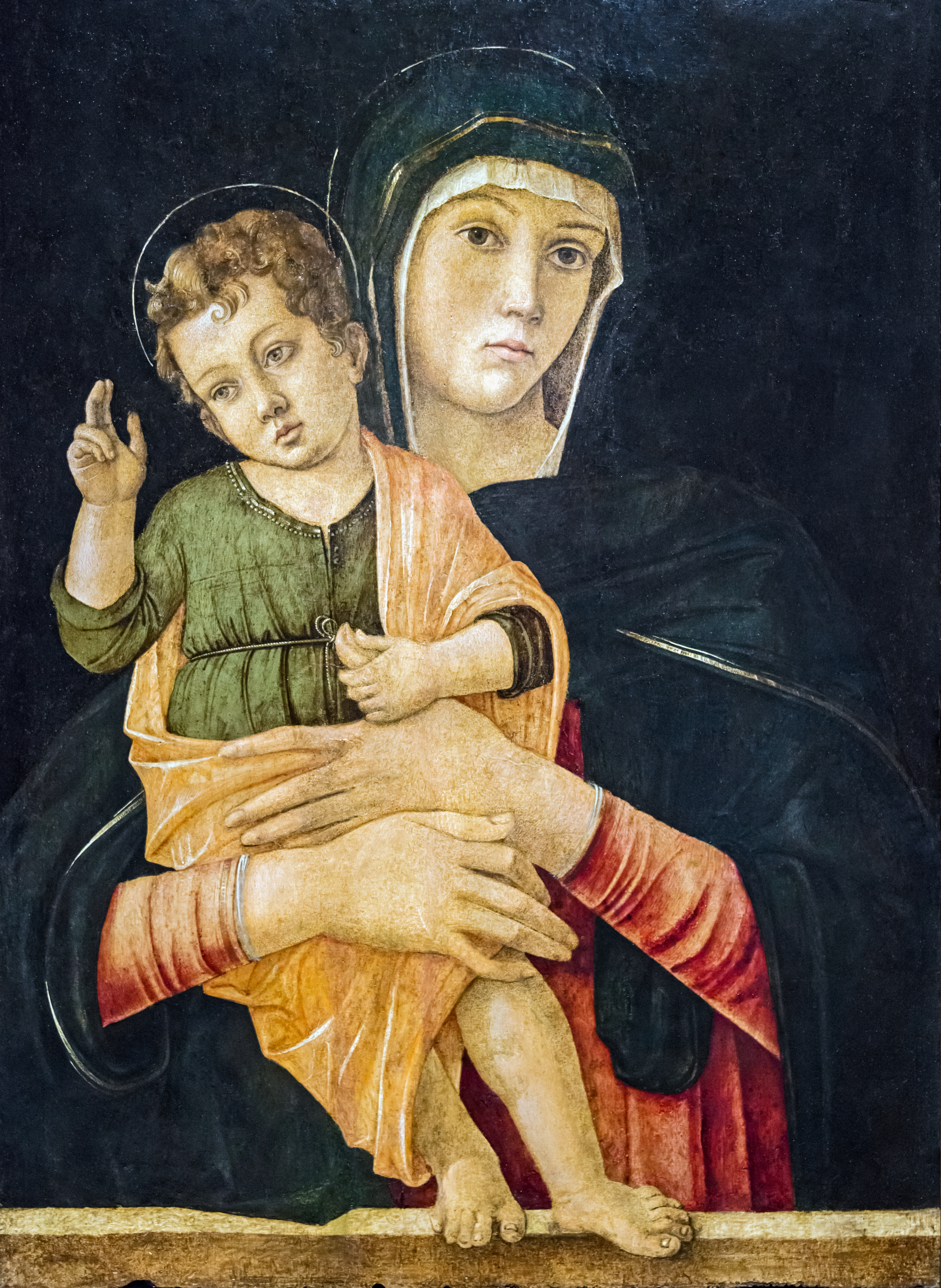
Madonna and Child Blessing

Madonna and Child Blessing is a 79 cm by 63 cm tempera-on-panel painting by the Italian Renaissance artist Giovanni Bellini. It dates to 1460–1464 and originally hung in the offices of the Magistrato del Monte Nuovissimo at Palazzo dei Camerlinghi in Venice. At present, it is part of the collection of the same city's Gallerie dell'Accademia.

== See also ==
- List of works by Giovanni Bellini
