= Madonna and Child (Bellini, Verona) =

Painting by Giovanni Bellini

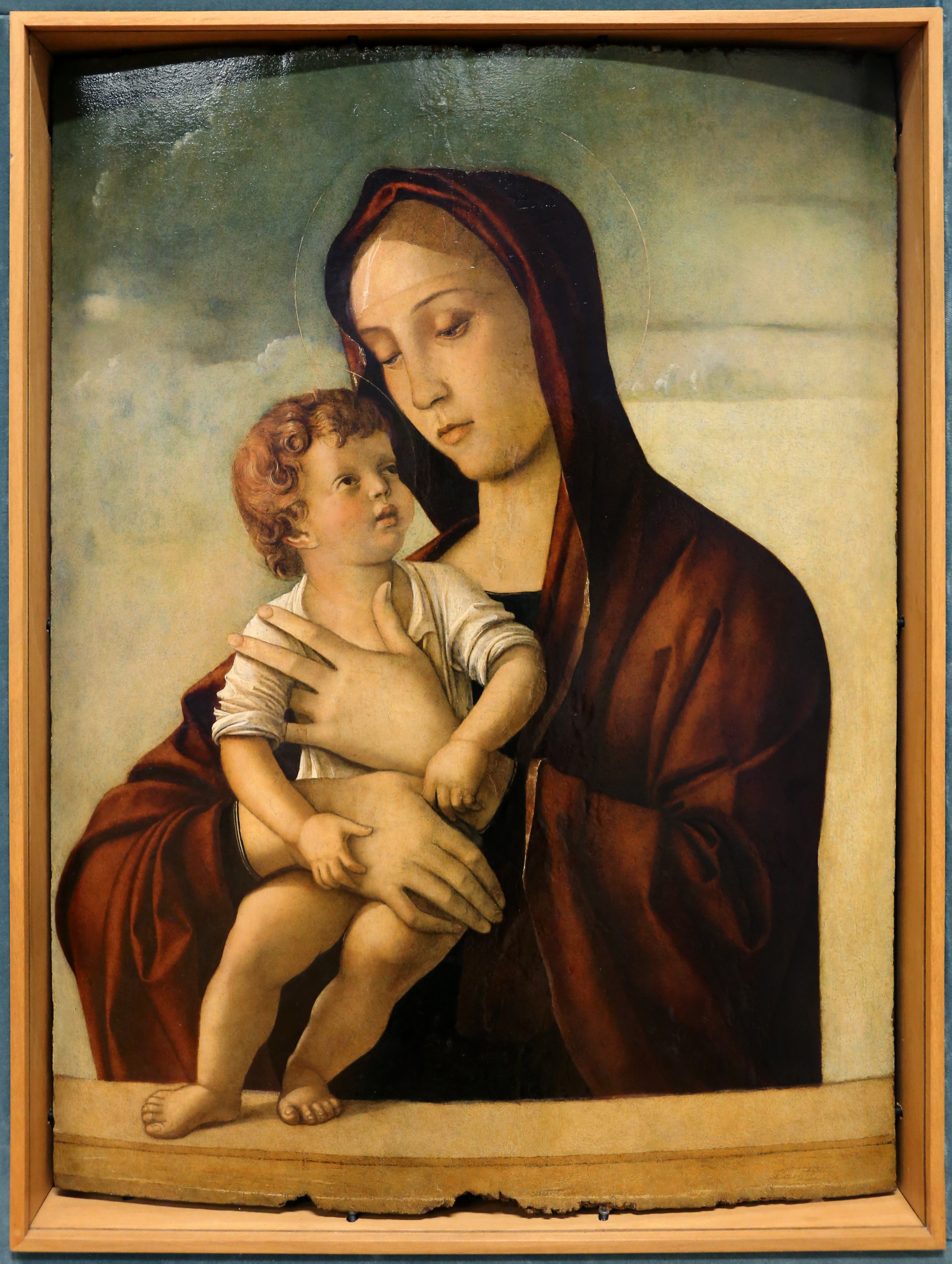
Madonna and Child, Museo di Castelvecchio, Verona

Madonna and Child is a c.1475 tempera-on-panel painting by the Italian Renaissance artist Giovanni Bellini, now in the Museo di Castelvecchio in Verona. It measures 77 cm by 57 cm.

== See also ==
- List of works by Giovanni Bellini
