= Portrait of a Young Man (Bellini, Washington) =

Painting by Giovanni Bellini

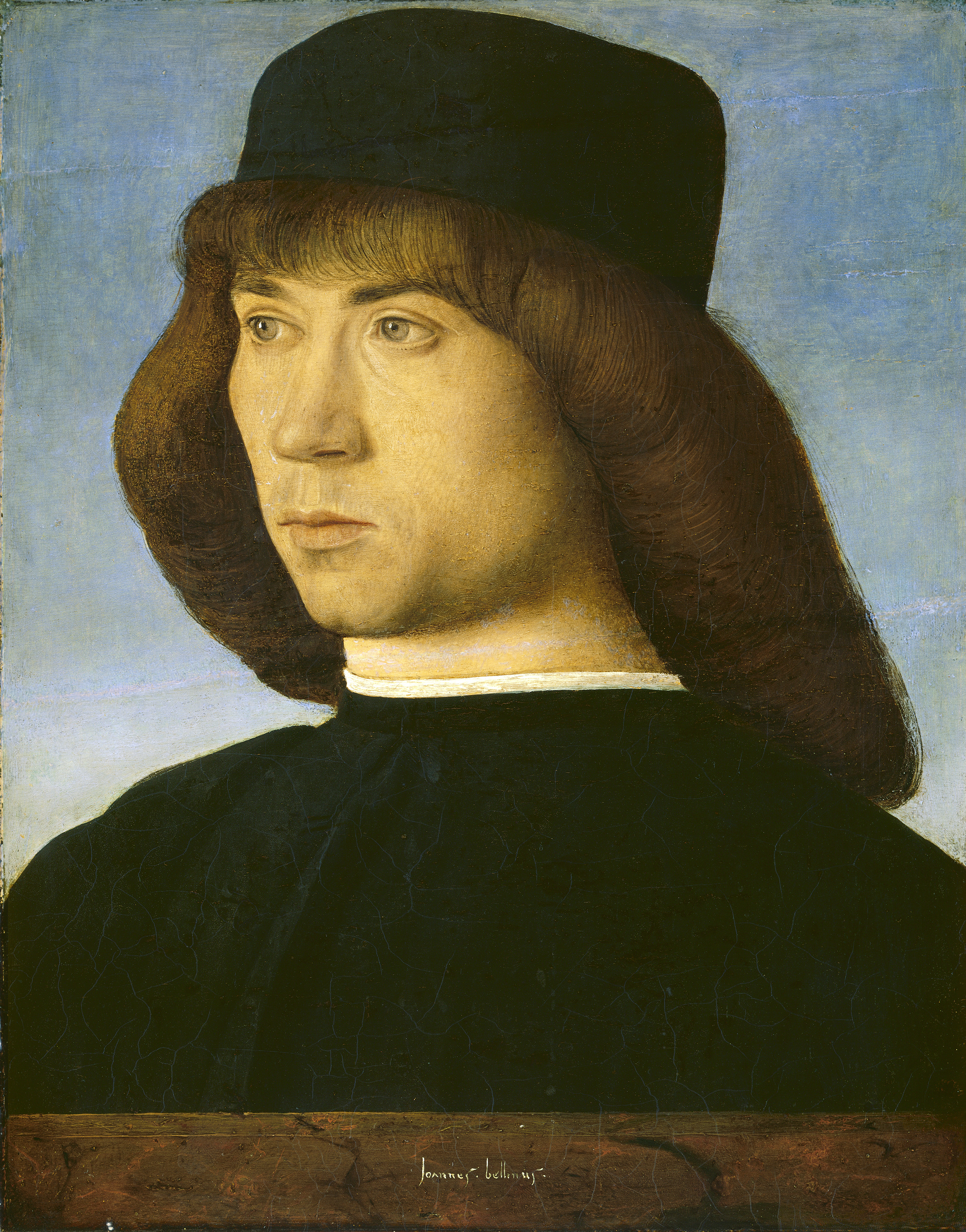
- Artist: Giovanni Bellini
- Year: 1490 (Julian)
- Medium: oil paint, poplar panel
- Dimensions: 30 cm (12 in) × 23 cm (9.1 in)
- Location: National Gallery of Art - Gallery 12
- Accession no.: 1939.1.182

Portrait of a Young Man is a c.1500 oil-on-panel portrait of an unknown subject by the Italian Renaissance master Giovanni Bellini. It measures 31×25 cm and is now in the National Gallery of Art in Washington.

== See also ==
- List of works by Giovanni Bellini
