= The Assassination of Saint Peter Martyr (Bellini) =

Painting by Giovanni Bellini

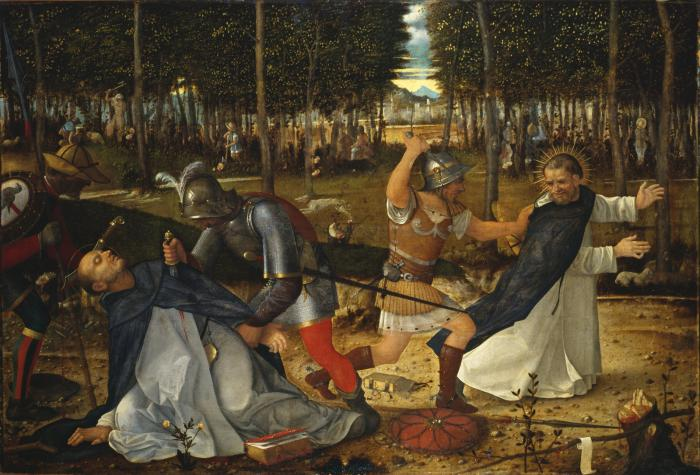
The Assassination of Saint Peter Martyr – Courtauld version

The Assassination of Saint Peter Martyr is an painting in oil and tempera on wood, executed c. 1507 by the Italian Renaissance master Giovanni Bellini. The painting measures 67 by 100 cm and is now in the National Gallery, London. A workshop version of around 1509 is now in the Courtauld Gallery. Both paintings show the murder of Saint Peter Martyr.

== See also ==
- List of works by Giovanni Bellini
