= Madonna and Child with Saint Peter and Saint Sebastian =

Painting by Giovanni Bellini

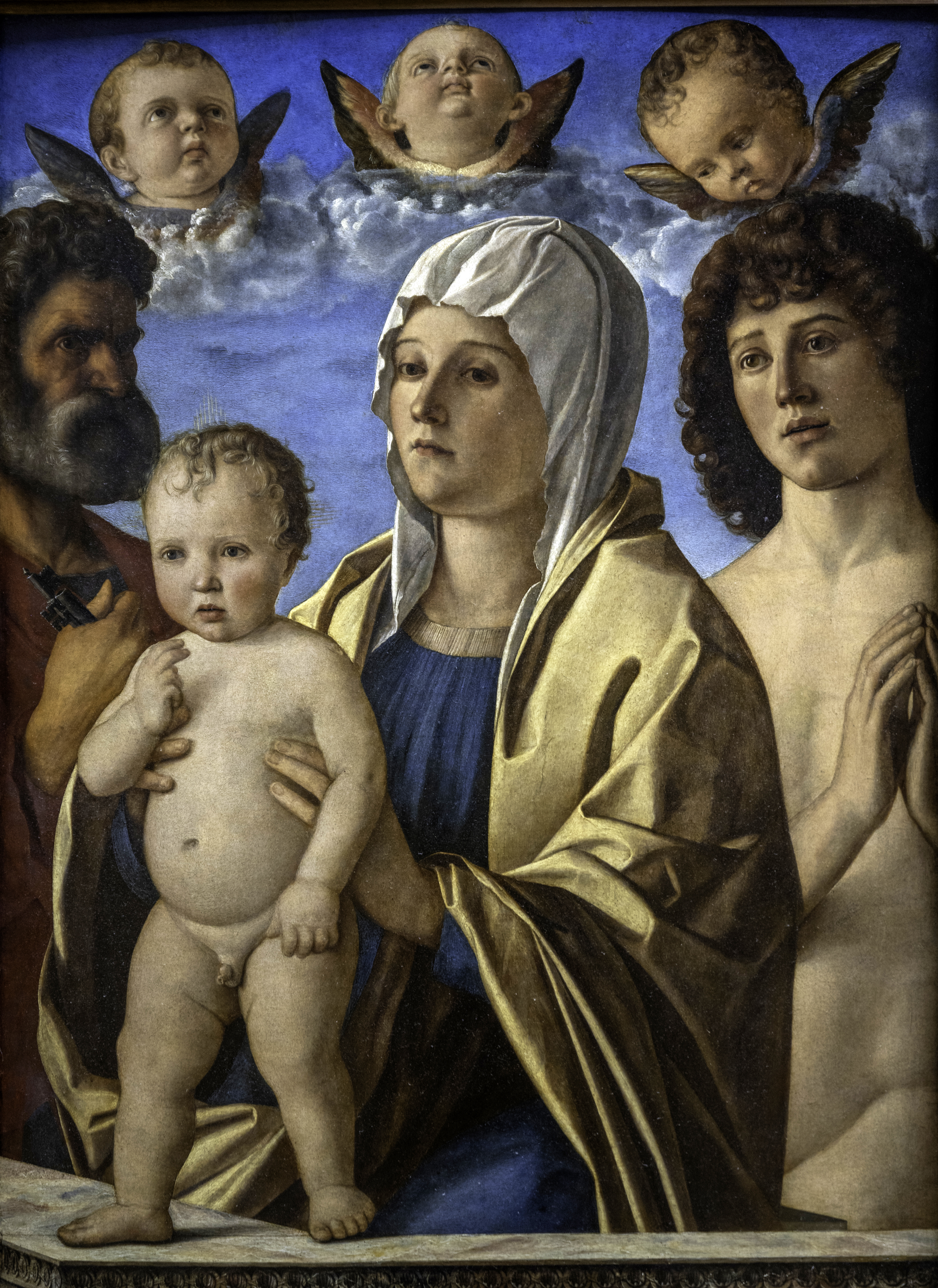
- Artist: Giovanni Bellini
- Year: 1487
- Medium: Oil on panel
- Dimensions: 84 cm × 61 cm (33 in × 24 in)
- Location: Louvre, Paris

Madonna and Child with Saint Peter and Saint Sebastian is an 84 cm by 61 cm oil painting by the Italian Renaissance artist Giovanni Bellini, dating to 1487 and bought in 1859 by the Louvre in Paris, where it still hangs today.

== See also ==
- List of works by Giovanni Bellini
