= Lehman Madonna =

1470 painting by Giovanni Bellini

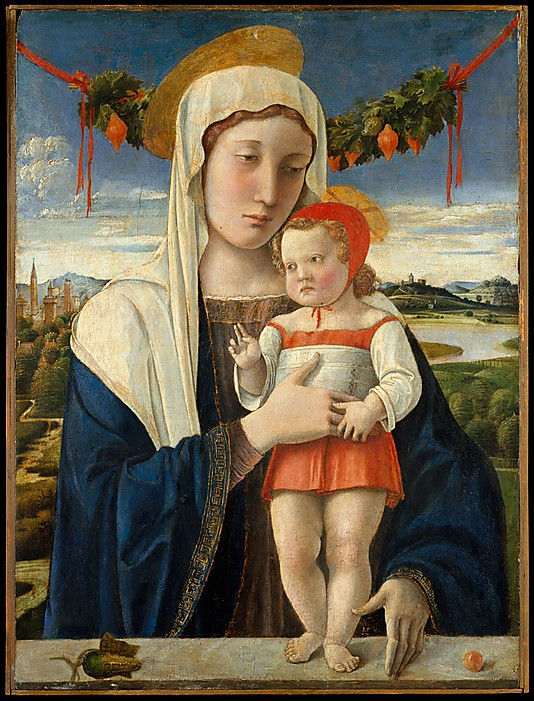
- Artist: Giovanni Bellini
- Medium: tempera on panel
- Dimensions: 72 cm × 46 cm (28 in × 18 in)
- Location: Metropolitan Museum of Art, New York
- Website: Catalogue entry

The Lehman Madonna is a c.1470 tempera-on-panel painting of the Madonna and Child by the Venetian painter Giovanni Bellini.

This early work by Bellini demonstrates the influence of his brother-in-law, the Paduan artist Andrea Mantegna. The orange-colored gourds in the garland hanging behind the Madonna's head symbolize the Resurrection; the fruit at the right might be a cherry, representing the Eucharist (Holy Communion) or an apple, representing the Fall of Man in the Garden of Eden. The gourd on the left has been identified by Levi d'Ancona as a Balsam Pear.

The painting was recorded in the Villa San Mauro, Rieti, Italy in 1911 and was acquired by Philip Lehman in or before June 1916. His son Robert bequeathed it in 1975 to the Metropolitan Museum of Art in New York City, to which it still belongs.

As of 2018, the painting is not on view.

== See also ==
- List of works by Giovanni Bellini
