= List of works by Giovanni Bellini =

Giovanni Bellini (c. 1430 – 26 November 1516) was a Venetian Renaissance painter, probably the best known of the Bellini family of Venetian painters. His father was Jacopo Bellini, his brother was Gentile Bellini (who was more highly regarded than Giovanni during his lifetime, although the reverse is true today), and his brother-in-law was Andrea Mantegna. He was considered to have revolutionized Venetian painting, moving it towards a more sensuous and colouristic style. Through the use of clear, slow-drying oil paints, Giovanni created deep, rich tints and detailed shadings. His sumptuous coloring and fluent, atmospheric landscapes had a great effect on the Venetian painting school, especially on his pupils Giorgione and Titian.

== List ==
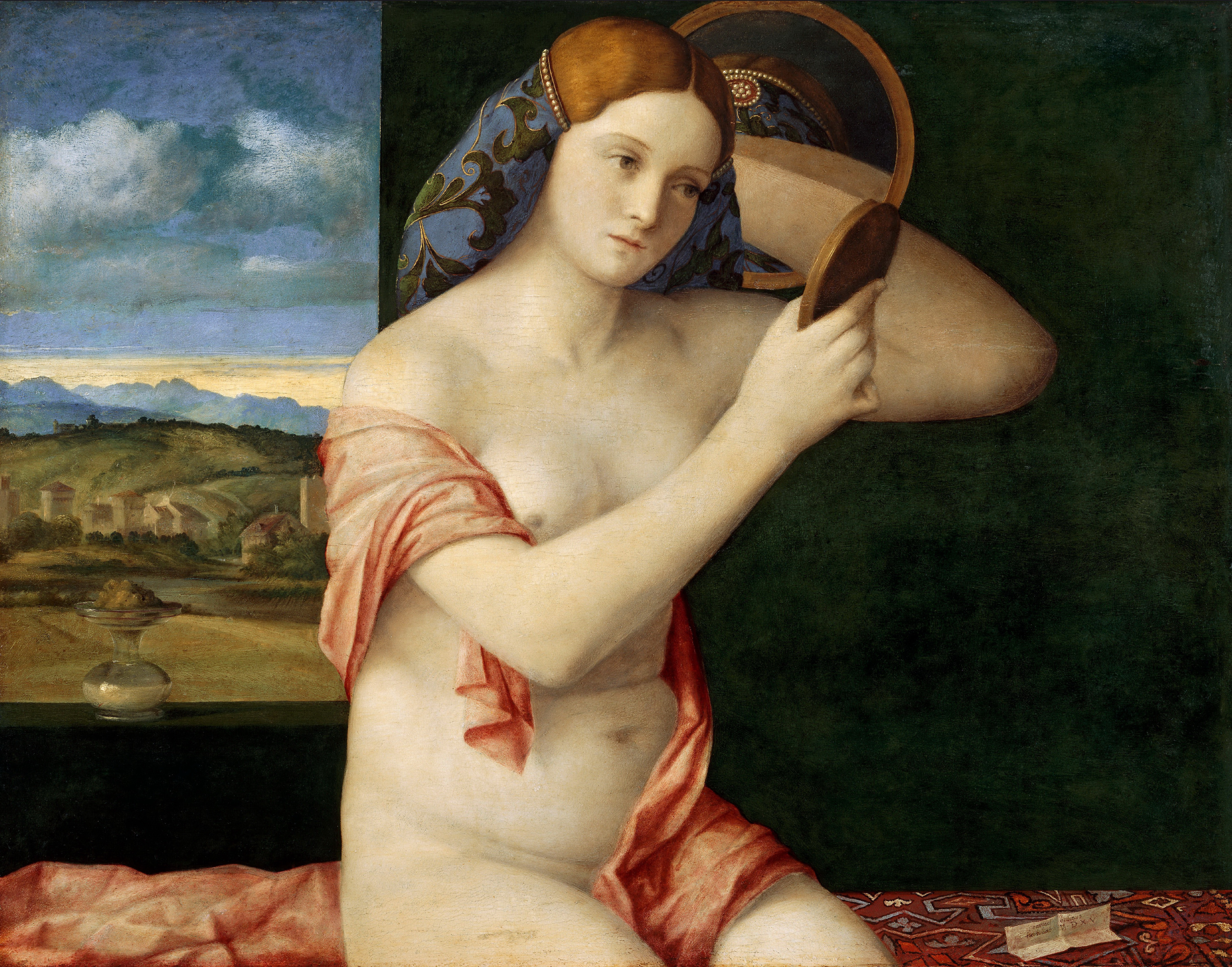
Naked Young Woman in Front of the Mirror, Bellini's first female nude, painted when he was about 85 years old, circa 1515

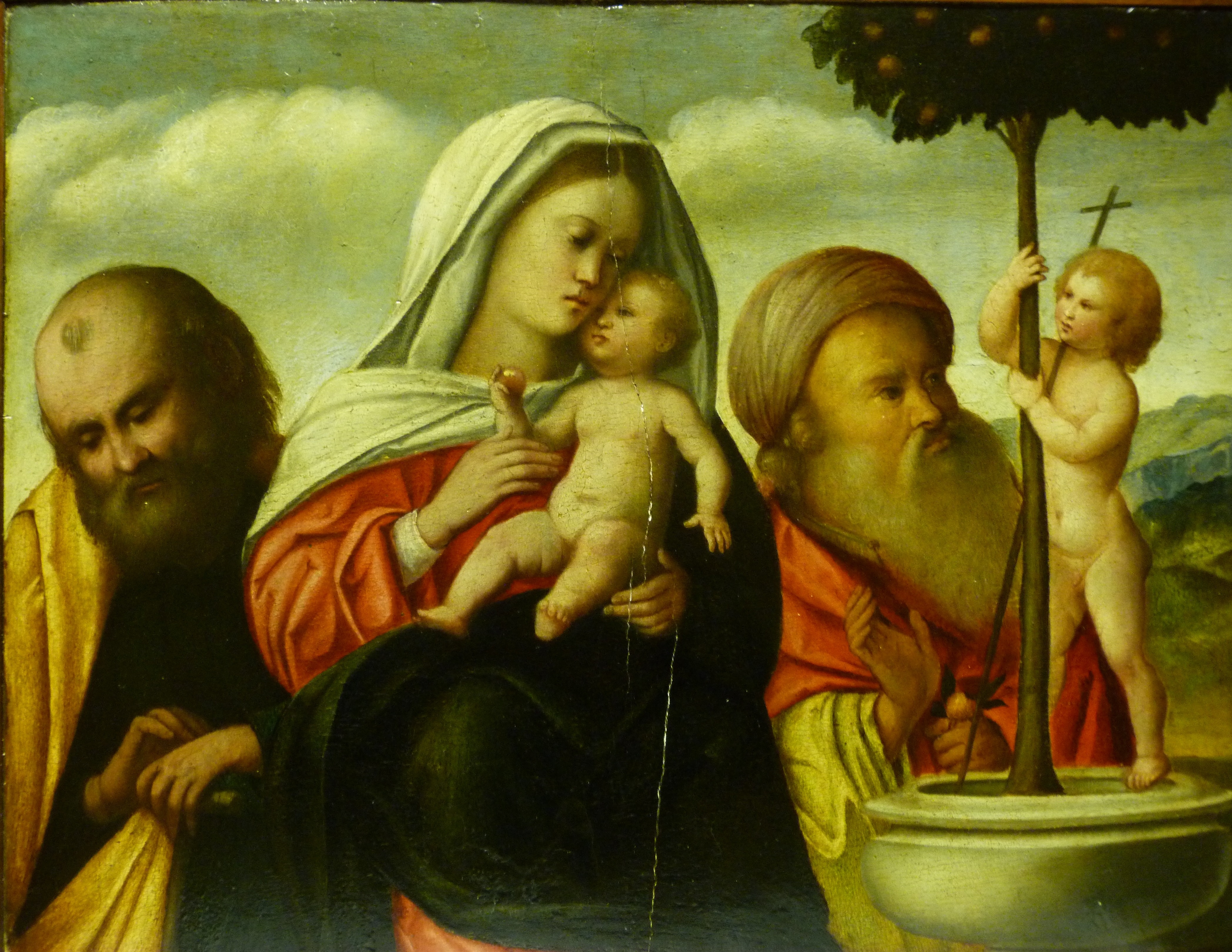
Madonna with the Infant St John the Baptist and St Joseph

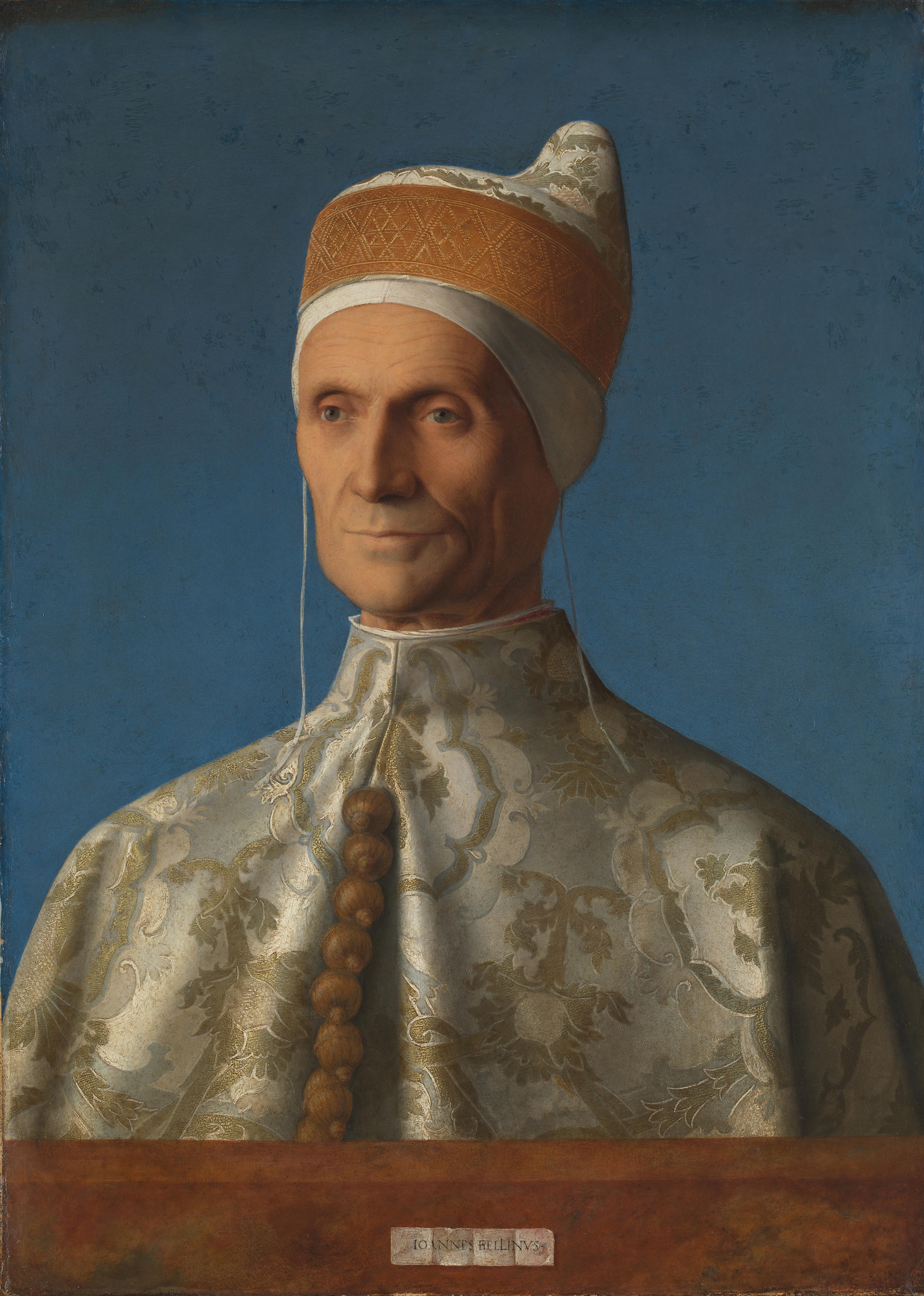
Portrait of Doge Leonardo Loredan

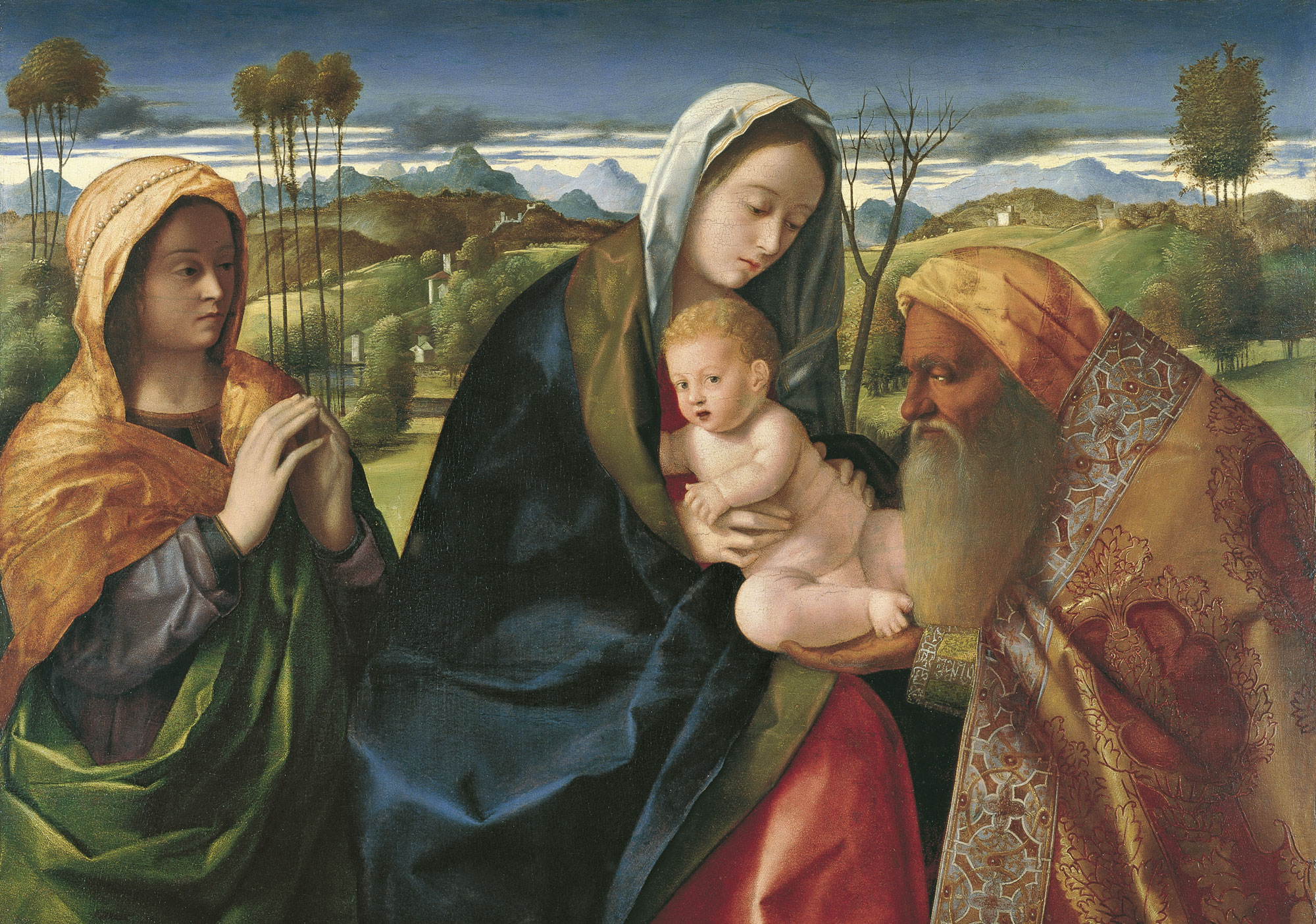
Nunc dimittis (c. 1505–1510), Thyssen-Bornemisza museum, Madrid

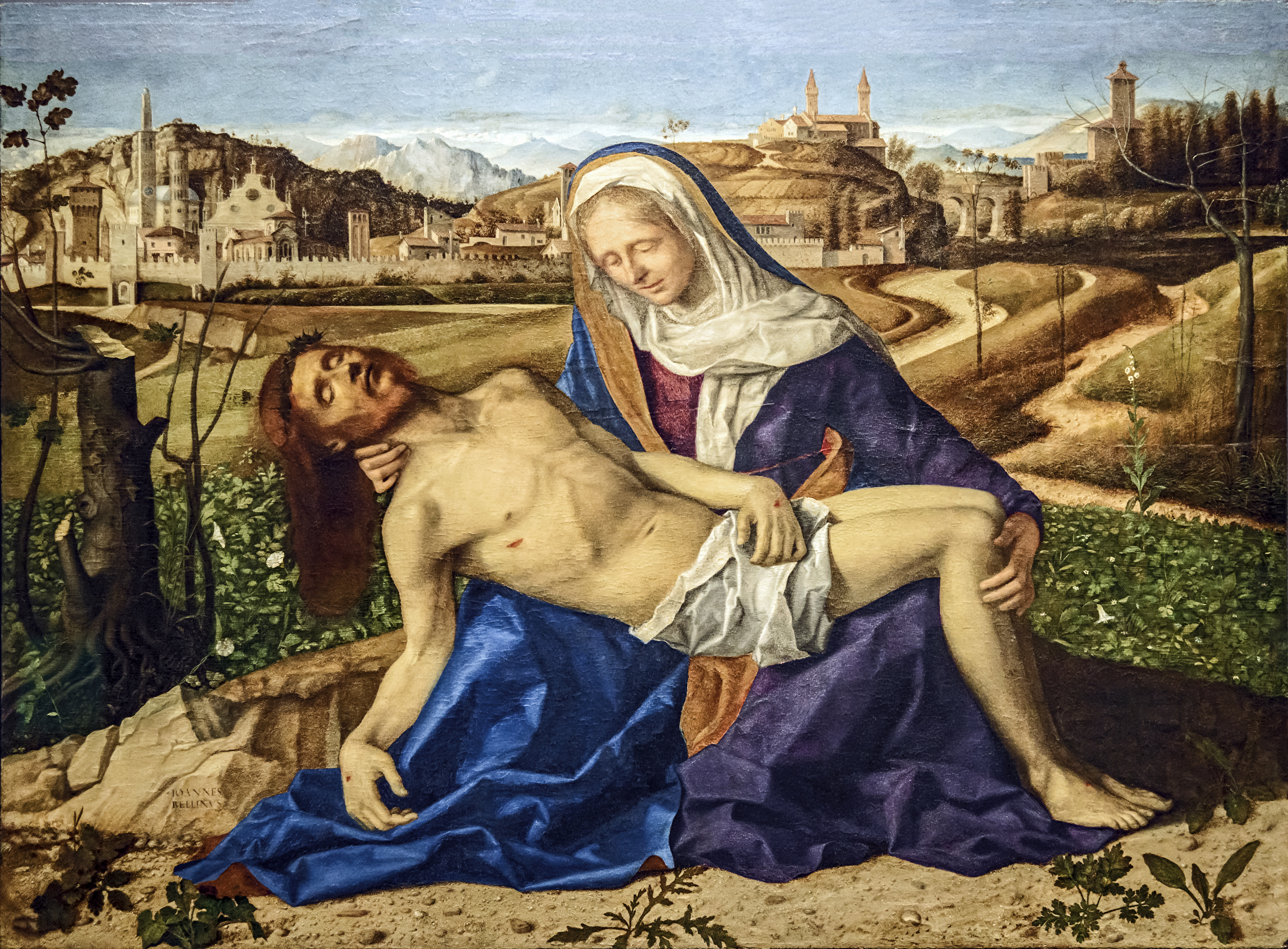
Pietà (c. 1505), Bellini's last pietà

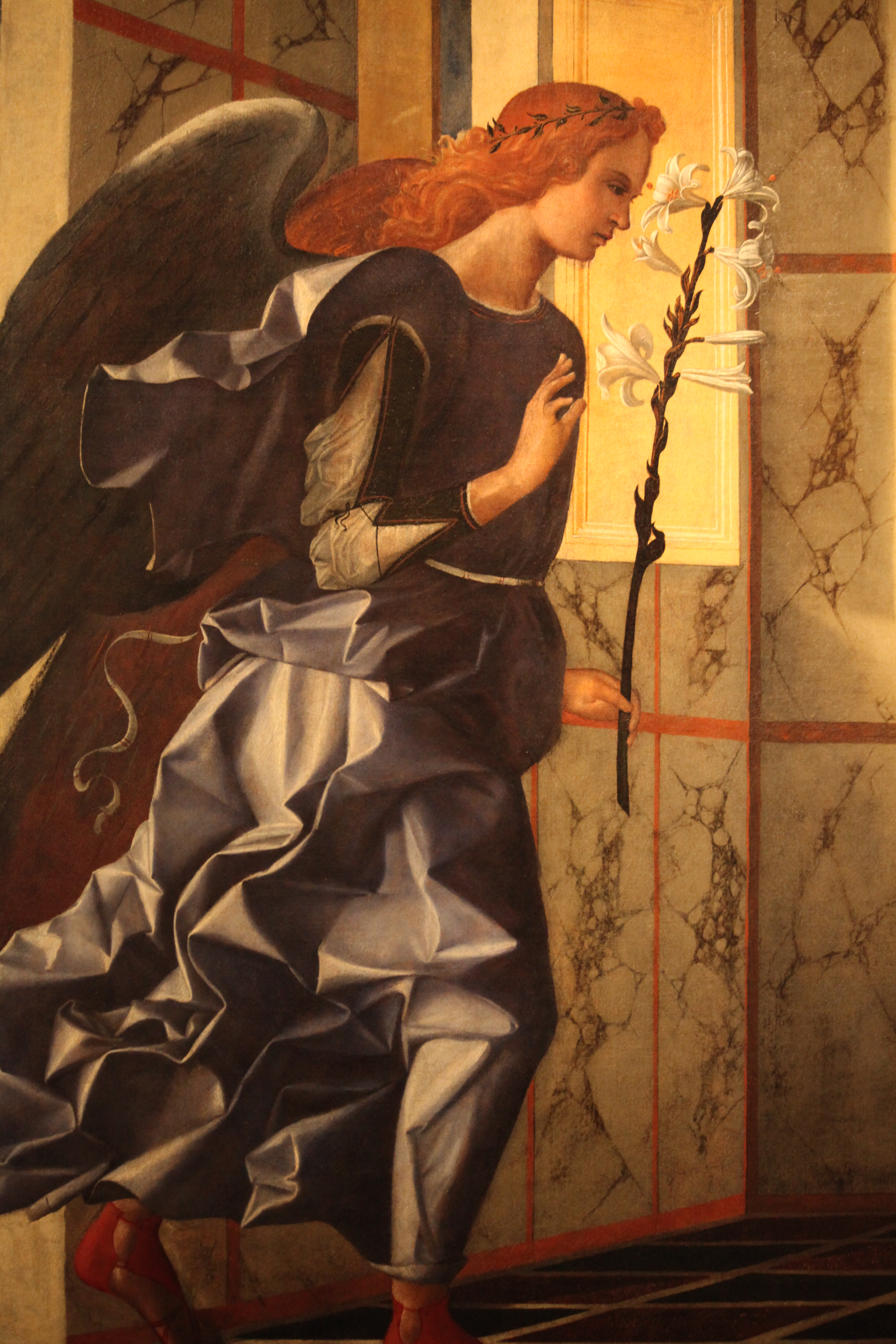
The Annunciation angel

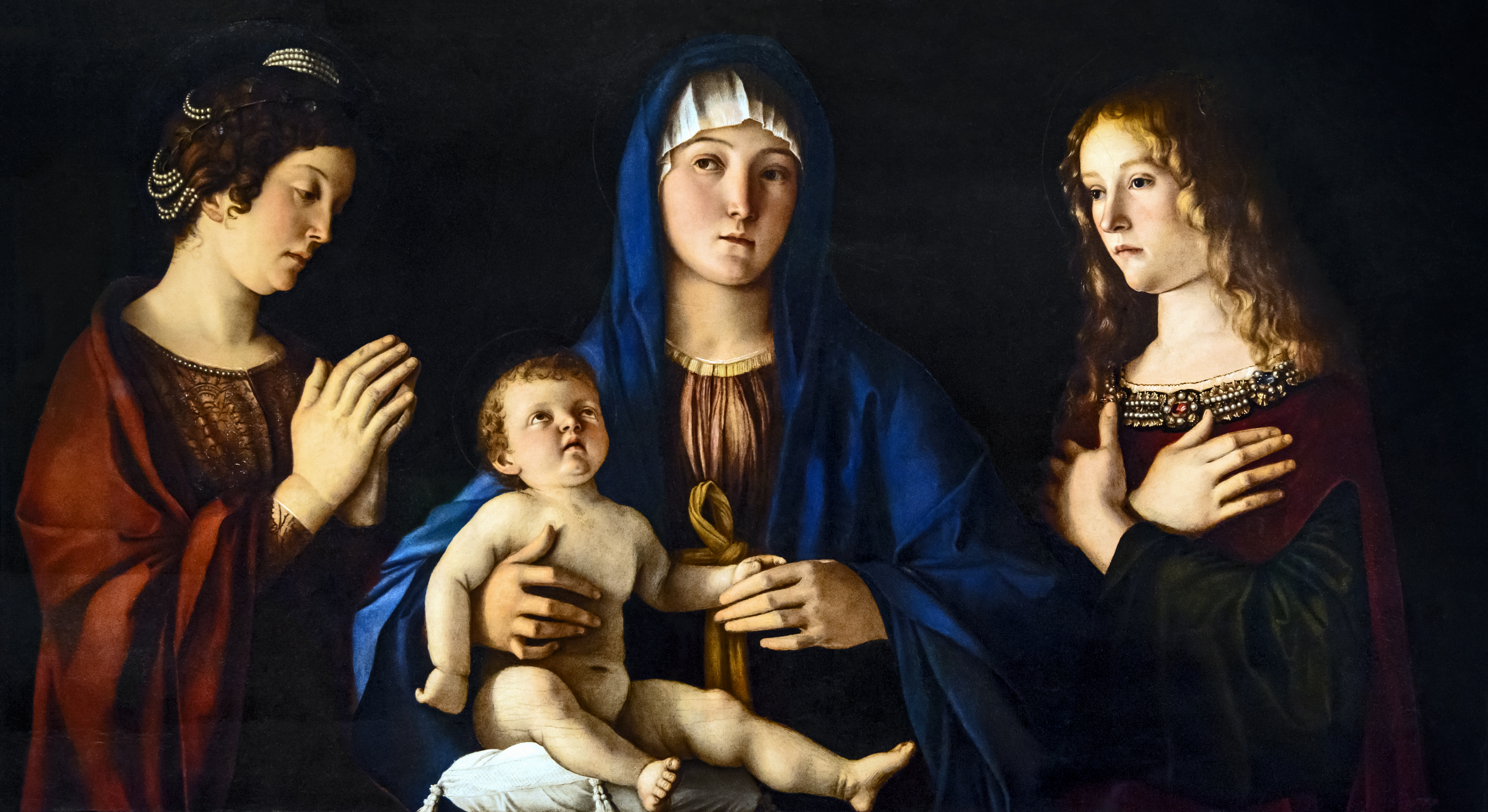
Sacra conversazione dell'accademia

=== Early (1450–1465) ===
- Madonna and Child (1450–1460) – Tempera on wood, 47 x 31.5 cm, Civico Museo Malaspina, Pavia
- Dead Christ Supported by the Madonna and St. John (1455) – Tempera on wood, 52 x 42 cm, Accademia Carrara, Bergamo
- Crucifixion (c. 1455–1460) – Tempera on wood, 54.5 x 30 cm, Museo Correr, Venice
- Transfiguration (c. 1455–1460) – Tempera on panel, 134 x 68 cm, Museo Correr, Venice
- The Dead Christ Supported by the Virgin Mary and St John the Evangelist (1460) – Tempera on panel, 86 x 107 cm, Pinacoteca di Brera, Milan
- Dead Christ Supported by Two Angels (Pietà, c. 1460) – Tempera on panel, 74 x 50 cm, Museo Correr, Venice
- Pietà (c. 1460) – Tempera on panel, 48 x 38 cm, Museo Poldi Pezzoli, Milan
- Blessing Christ (c. 1460) – Tempera on wood, 58 x 44 cm, Musée du Louvre, Paris
- The Blood of the Redeemer (c. 1460) – Tempera on panel, 134 x 68 cm, National Gallery, London
- Madonna and Child (1460–1465) – Tempera on panel, 78 x 54 cm, Civiche Raccolte d'Arte, Milan
- Madonna and Child Blessing (1460–1464) – Tempera on wood, 79 x 63 cm, Gallerie dell'Accademia, Venice
- Madonna and Child (Greek Madonna, 1460–1464) – Tempera on wood, 82 x 62 cm, Pinacoteca di Brera, Milan
- Madonna and Child (Frizzoni Madonna) (1460–1464) – Oil on canvas transferred from wood, 52 x 42.5 cm, Museo Correr, Venice
- Presentation at the Temple (1460–1464) – Tempera on wood, 80 x 105 cm, Galleria Querini Stampalia, Venice
- Virgin and Child (early 1460s) – Tempera and oil on panel, 64.5 x 44.1 cm, Philadelphia Museum of Art
- The Head of St John the Baptist (1464–1468) – Tempera on wood, diameter 28 cm, Musei Civici, Pesaro
- Polyptych of S. Vincenzo Ferreri (1464–1468) – Tempera on panel, Basilica dei Santi Giovanni e Paolo, Venice
- Agony in the Garden (c. 1465) – Tempera on wood, 81 x 127 cm, National Gallery, London
- Dead Christ Supported by Two Angels (c. 1465–1470) – Tempera on wood, 83 x 68 cm, Gemäldegalerie, Berlin

=== Maturity (1465–1505) ===
- Madonna and Child (Lehman Madonna) (c. 1470) – Tempera on panel, 72 x 46 cm, Metropolitan Museum of Art, New York
- Pesaro Altarpiece (c.1471-c.1483) - Oil on panel, 262 x 240 cm, Musei Civici, Pesaro
- Pietà (1472) – Tempera on canvas, 115 x 317 cm, Doge's Palace, Venice
- Portrait of Georg Fugger (1474) – Tempera on panel, 26 x 20 cm, Norton Simon Museum, Pasadena, California
- Dead Christ Supported by Angels (c. 1474) – Tempera on panel, 91 x 131 cm, Pinacoteca Comunale, Rimini
- Madonna and Child (Lochis Madonna) (1475) – Tempera on panel, 47 x 34 cm, Accademia Carrara, Bergamo
- Enthroned Madonna Adoring the Sleeping Christ Child (1475) – Tempera on wood, 120 x 65 cm, Gallerie dell'Accademia, Venice
- Madonna and Child (c. 1475) – Tempera on panel, 77 x 57 cm, Museo di Castelvecchio, Verona
- Madonna and Child (c. 1475) – Tempera on panel, 75 x 50 cm, Santa Maria dell'Orto, Venice
- Madonna Adoring the Sleeping Christ Child (c. 1475) – Tempera on panel, 77 x 56 cm, Contini Bonacossi Collection, Florence
- Madonna and Child (1475–1480) – Oil on panel, 78 x 56 cm, Gallerie dell'Accademia, Venice
- Portrait of a Humanist (1475–1480) – Oil on panel, 35 x 28 cm, Civiche Raccolte d'Arte, Milan
- Resurrection of Christ (1475–1479) – Oil on panel, 148 x 128 cm, Staatliche Museen, Berlin
- St. Francis in Ecstasy (c.1480) – Oil on panel, 124 x 142 cm, Frick Collection, New York, United States
- St. Jerome in the Desert (c. 1480) – Oil on panel, 145x 114 cm, Uffizi Gallery, Florence, Italy
- Transfiguration of Christ (c. 1480) – Oil on panel, 116 x 154 cm, Museo di Capodimonte, Naples
- St. Jerome Reading in the Countryside (1480–1485) – Oil on wood, 47 x 34 cm, National Gallery, London
- Willys Madonna (1480–1490) – Oil on panel, 75 x 59 cm, São Paulo Museum of Art, São Paulo, Brazil
- Madonna and Child (Alzano Madonna; c. 1485) – Oil on panel, 83 x 66 cm, Accademia Carrara, Bergamo
- Madonna of Red Angels (c. 1485) – Oil on panel, 77 x 60 cm, Gallerie dell'Accademia, Venice
- Portrait of a Condottiero – Oil on wood, 51 x 37 cm, National Gallery of Art, Washington
- Portrait of a Young Man in Red (1485–1490) – Oil on panel, 32 x 26 cm, National Gallery of Art, Washington
- Madonna of the Small Trees (1487) – Oil on panel, 74 x 58 cm, Gallerie dell'Accademia, Venice
- Madonna and Child (1485–1490) – Oil on panel, 88.9 x 71.1 cm, Metropolitan Museum of Art, New York
- San Giobbe Altarpiece (c. 1487) – Oil on panel, 471 x 258 cm, Gallerie dell'Accademia, Venice
- Madonna and Child with Saint Peter and Saint Sebastian (c. 1487) – Oil on panel, 84 x 61 cm, Musée du Louvre, Paris
- Frari Triptych (1488) – Oil on panel, Santa Maria Gloriosa dei Frari, Venice
- Barbarigo Altarpiece (1488) – Oil on canvas, 200 x 320 cm, San Pietro Martire, Murano
- Madonna and Child with Saint Mary Magdalene and Saint Ursula, also named Sacred Conversation, (1490) – Oil on panel, 77 x 104 cm, Museo del Prado, Madrid
- Allegories (c. 1490) – Gallerie dell'Accademia, Venice
- Madonna and Child with Saint Catherine and Saint Mary Magdalene, also named Sacred Conversation, (c. 1490) – Oil on wood, 58 x 107 cm, Gallerie dell'Accademia, Venice
- Holy Allegory (c. 1490) – Oil on panel, 73 x 199 cm, Uffizi, Florence
- Madonna and Child with the Infant St. John the Baptist (1490–1495) – Oil on canvas, 76.2×58.4 cm, Indianapolis Museum of Art
- Portrait of a Gentleman (1490–1500) – Oil on wood, 31×26 cm, Uffizi, Florence
- The Lamentation over the Body of Christ (c. 1500) – Tempera on wood, 76 x 121 cm, Uffizi, Florence
- Annunciation (Gabriel and Mary) (c. 1500) – Oil on canvas, 224 x 105 cm (each), Gallerie dell'Accademia, Venice
- Portrait of a Young Man (c. 1500) – Oil on panel, 32 x 26 cm, Musée du Louvre, Paris
- Portrait of a Young Man (c. 1500) – Oil on wood, 31 x 25 cm, National Gallery of Art, Washington
- Portrait of a Young Senator (1500) – Oil on wood, 31 x 26 cm, Uffizi, Florence
- Portrait of Doge Leonardo Loredan (1501) – Oil on panel, 61.5 x 45 cm, National Gallery, London
- Baptism of Christ (1500–1502) – Oil on canvas, 400 x 263 cm, Santa Corona, Vicenza
- Head of the Redeemer (1500–1502) – Oil on panel, 33 x 22 cm, Gallerie dell'Accademia, Venice
- Madonna and Child with St. John the Baptist and a Female Saint (1500–1504) – Oil on panel, 54 x 76 cm, Gallerie dell'Accademia, Venice
- Crucifixion (1501–1503) – Oil on panel, 81 x 49 cm, The Albert Gallery, Prato
- The saviour (c. 1502) - Oil on panel, 44 x 33 cm, Royal Academy of San Fernando, Madrid.
- Sermon of St. Mark in Alexandria (1504–1507) – mostly painted by brother Gentile; Giovanni completed it upon his brothers death; Oil on canvas, 347 x 770 cm, Pinacoteca di Brera, Milan

=== Final phase (1505–1516) ===
- St. Jerome in the Desert (possibly 1505 although some experts date it to 1480s.) – Oil on canvas, 49x 39 cm, National Gallery of Art, Washington
- Lamentation over the Dead Christ (c.1505) – Tempera on panel, 74 x 118 cm, Uffizi Gallery, Florence
- Sacred Conversation (1505–1510) – Oil on panel, 62 x 83 cm, Thyssen-Bornemisza Museum, Madrid
- San Zaccaria Altarpiece (1505) – Oil on canvas transferred from wood, 402 x 273 cm, San Zaccaria, Venice
- Madonna of the Meadow (Madonna del Prato; 1505) – Oil on canvas transferred from wood, 67 x 86 cm, National Gallery, London
- Pietà (Martinengo Pietà; 1505) – Oil on wood, 65 x 90 cm, Gallerie dell'Accademia, Venice
- The Assassination of Saint Peter Martyr (1507) – Egg tempera and oil on wood, 99.7 x 165.1 cm, National Gallery, London
- Madonna and Child with Four Saints and Donor (1507) – Oil on wood, 90 x 145 cm, San Francesco della Vigna, Venice
- Portrait of the Loredan Family (1507) – Egg tempera on poplar, 134.6 x 207.5 cm, Gemäldegalerie, Berlin
- Continence of Scipio (1507–1508) – Oil on canvas, 74.8 x 35.6 cm, National Gallery of Art, Washington
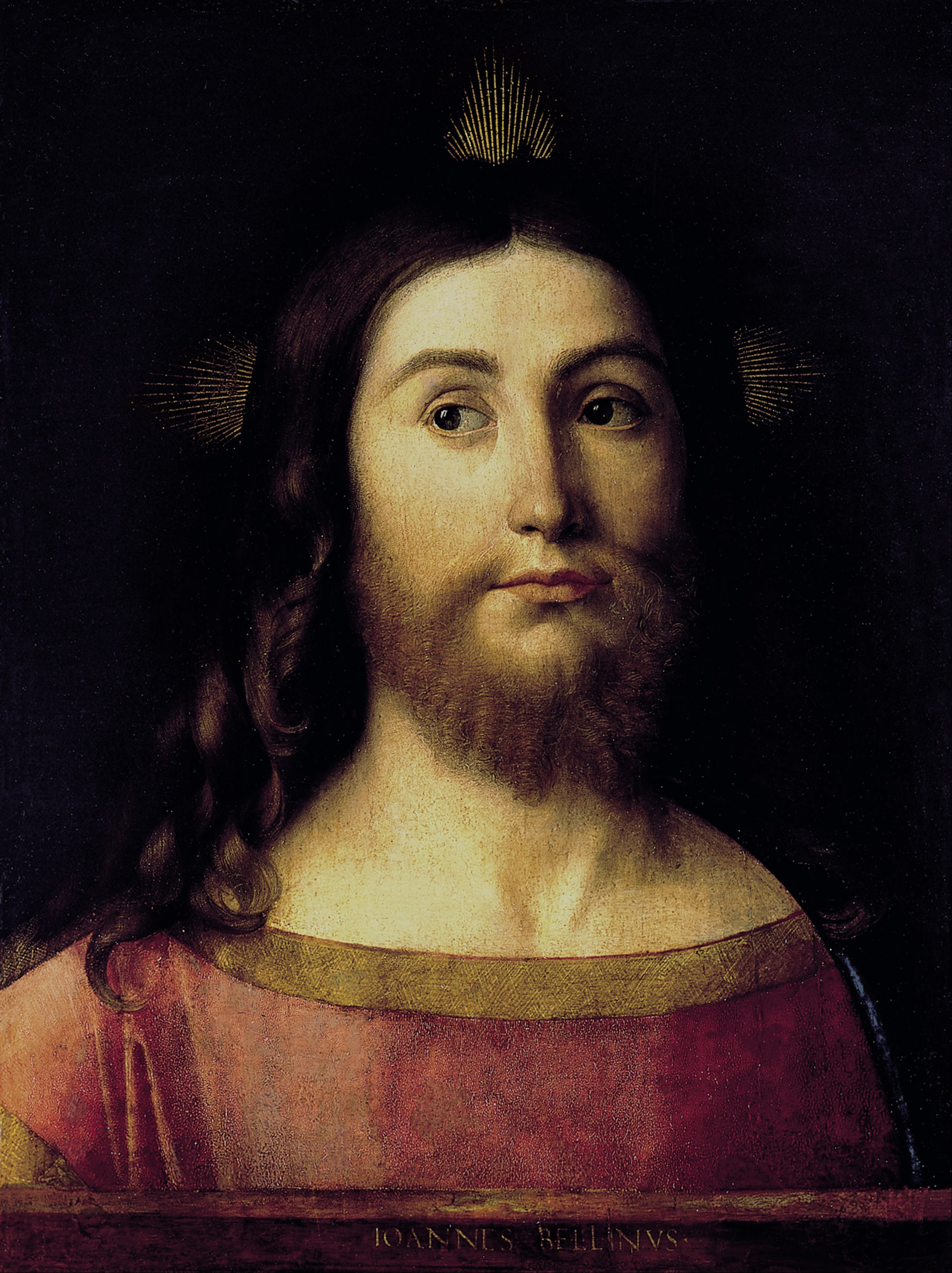
- c. 1502 belongs to the Real Academia de Bellas Artes de San Fernando, there's also a copy from his workshop at the Prado Museum and a preparatory drawing at the British Museum. Signed "Ioannes Bellinvs"
  The Murder of St. Peter the Martyr (1509) – Oil on panel, 67.3 x 100.4 cm, Courtauld Institute Galleries, London
- Madonna and Child (1509) – Oil on panel, 80 x 106 cm, Detroit Institute of Art
- Madonna and Child (1510) – Oil on wood, 85 x 118 cm, Pinacoteca di Brera, Milan
- Madonna and Child (c. 1510) – Oil on wood, 50 x 41 cm, Galleria Borghese, Rome
- Saints Christopher, Jerome and Louis of Toulouse (1513) – Oil on panel, 300 x 185 cm, S. Giovanni Crisostomo, Venice
- Feast of the Gods (1514) – Oil on cavas, 170 x 188 cm, National Gallery of Art, Washington
- Young Bacchus (c. 1514) – Oil on wood, 48 x 37 cm, National Gallery of Art, Washington
- Naked Young Woman in Front of the Mirror (1515) – Oil on canvas, 62 x 79 cm, Kunsthistorisches Museum, Vienna
- Portrait of Teodoro of Urbino (1515) – Oil on canvas, 63 x 49.5 cm, National Gallery, London
- Deposition (c. 1515) – Oil on canvas, 444 x 312 cm, Gallerie dell'Accademia, Venice
- Drunkenness of Noah (c. 1515) – Oil on canvas, 103 x 157 cm, Musée des Beaux-Arts, Besançon
- Madonna and Child with Donor (1502 until 1507) – Oil on canvas, National Museum of Poznań

== Gallery ==
Religious works

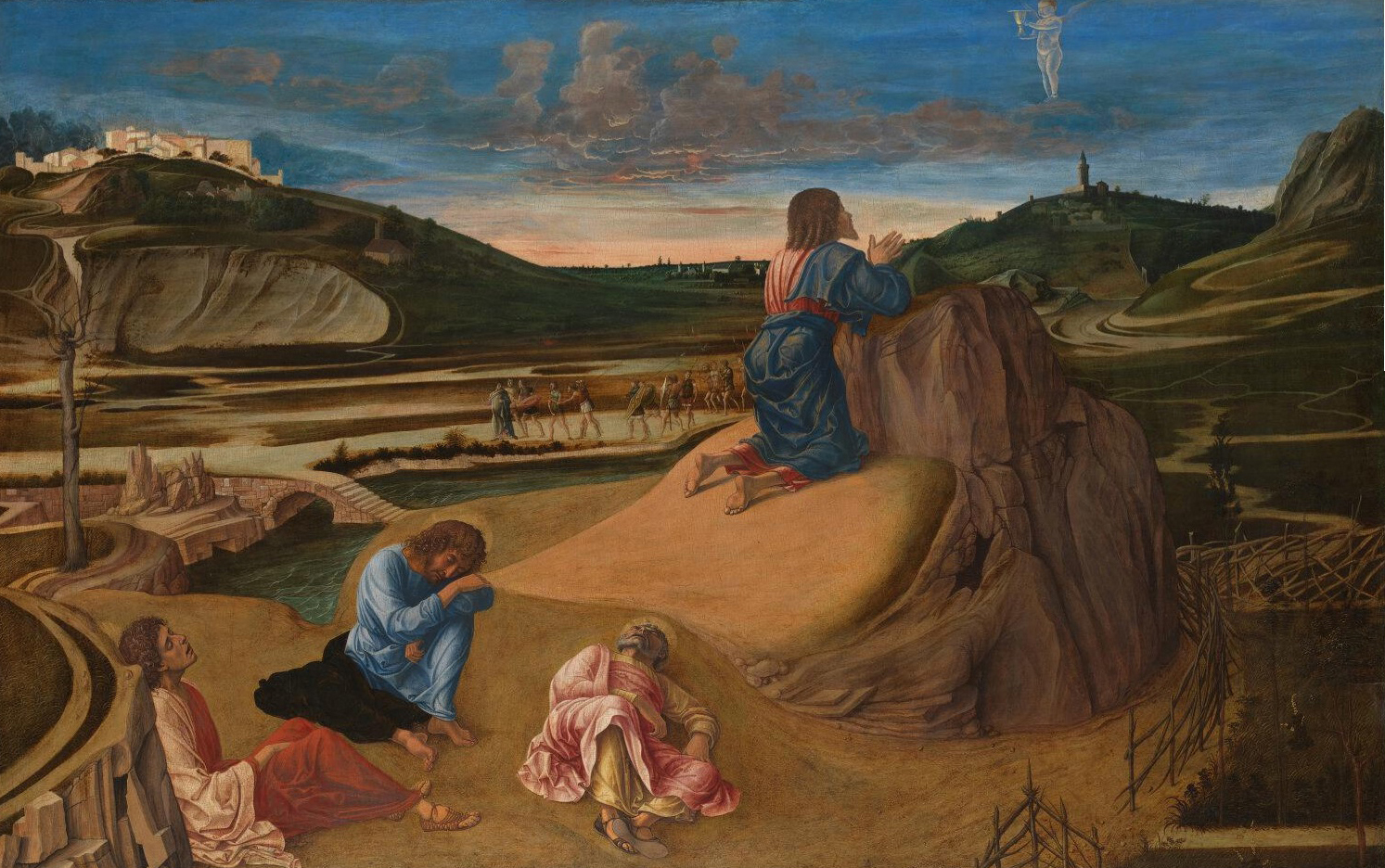
Bellini, Giovanni ~ Agony in the Garden, c. 1459, National Gallery, London

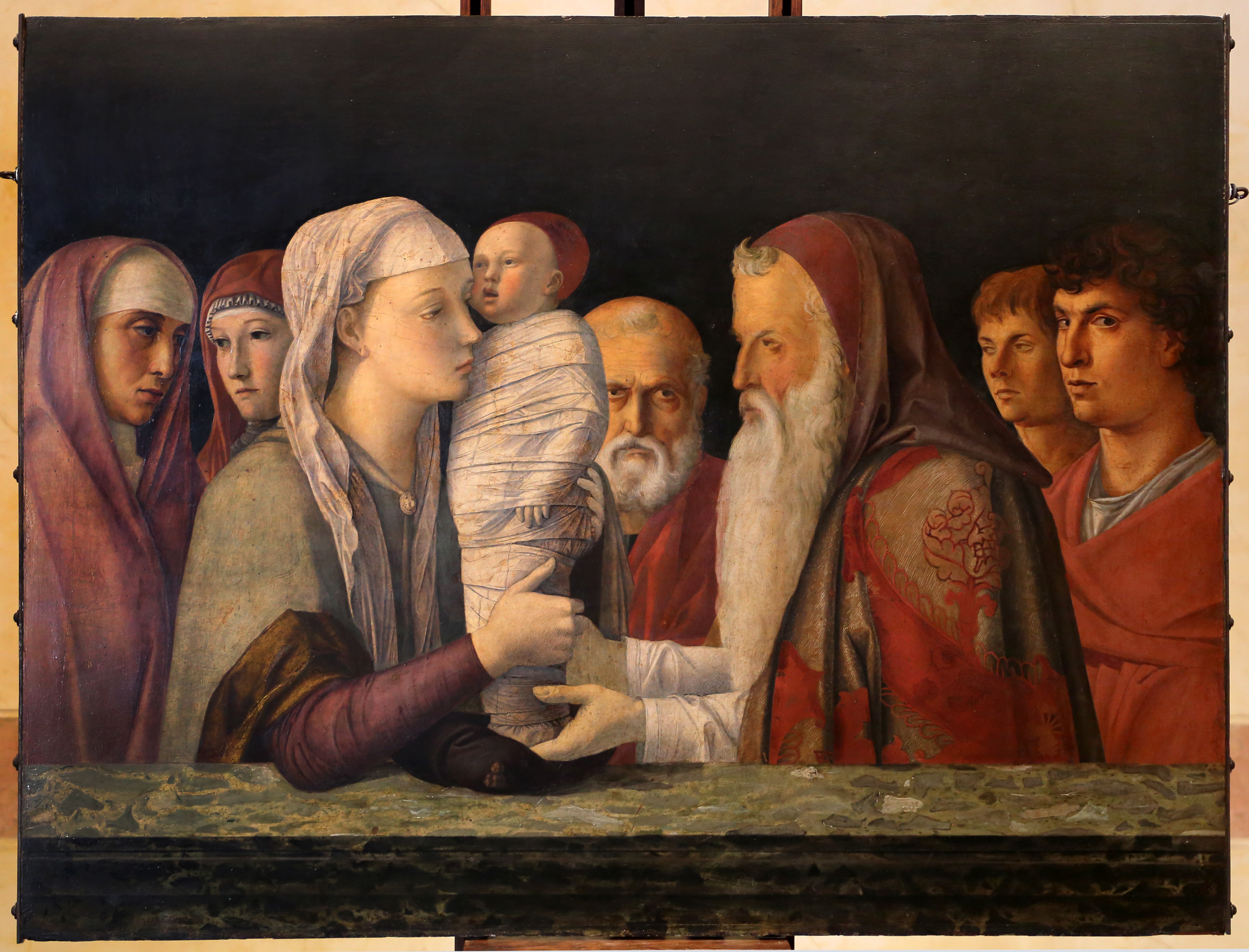
The Presentation at the Temple, c. 1459, Galleria Querini Stampalia, Venice.

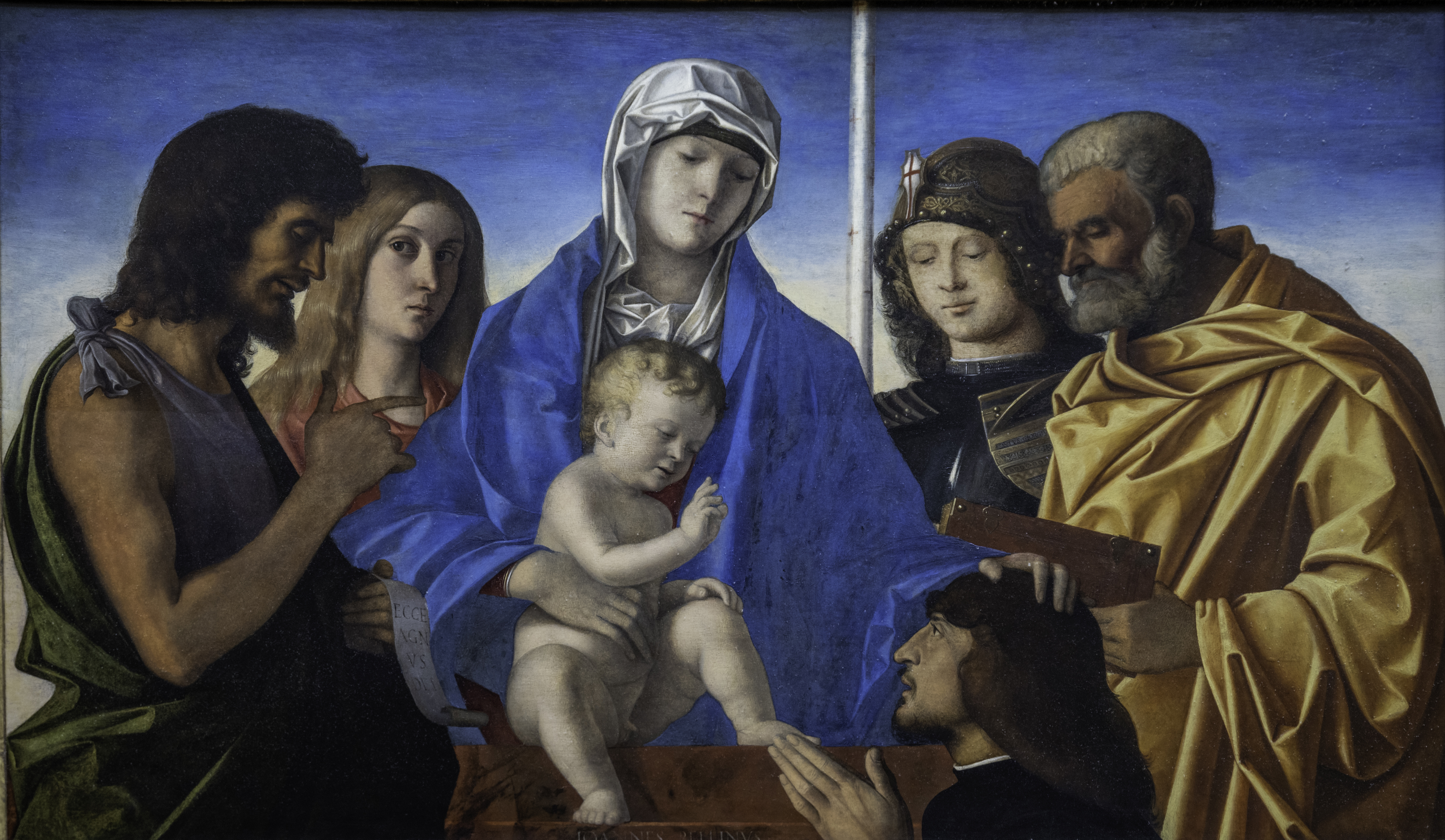
Madonna and Child with Saints, Louvre, Paris

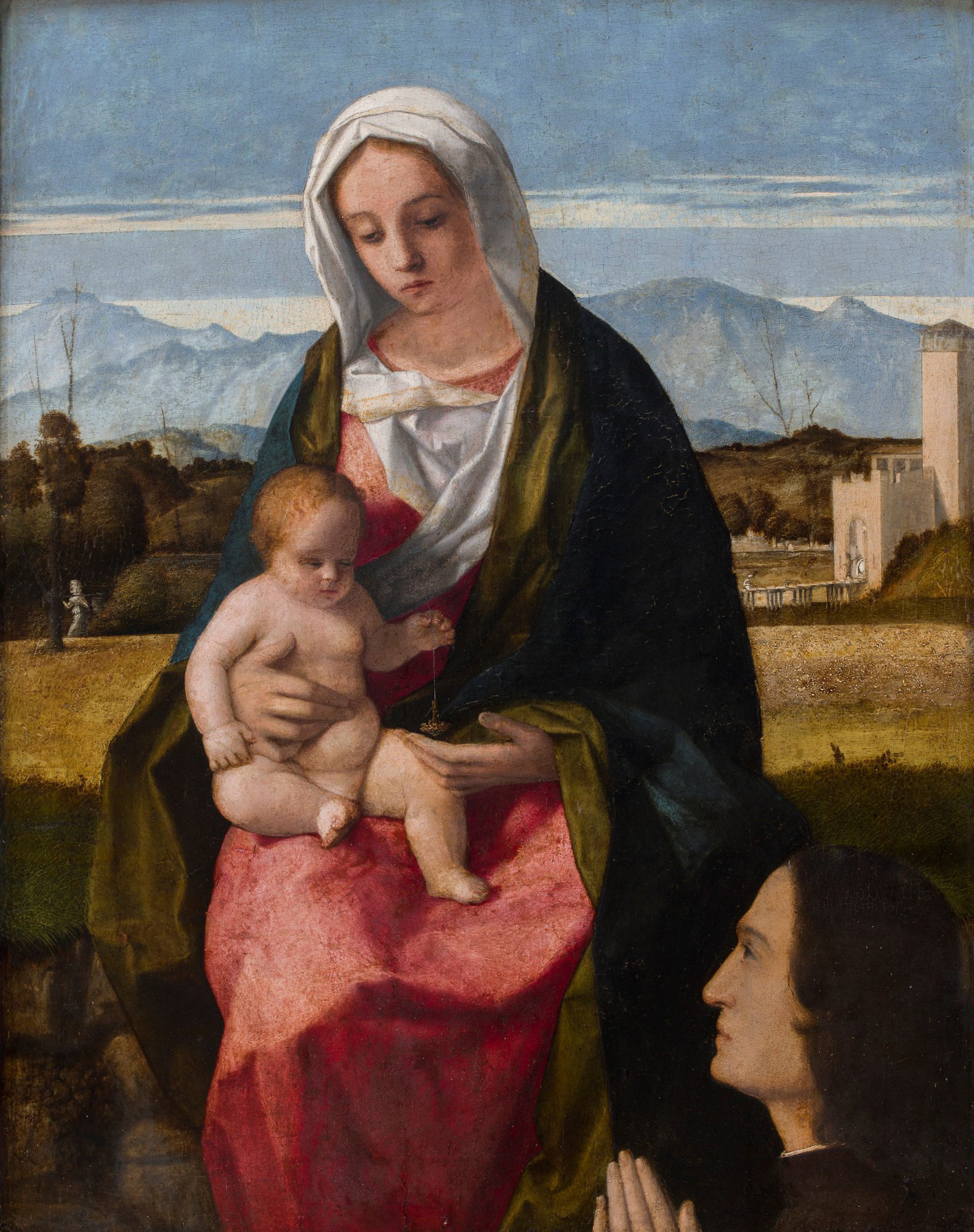
Madonna and Child with Donor

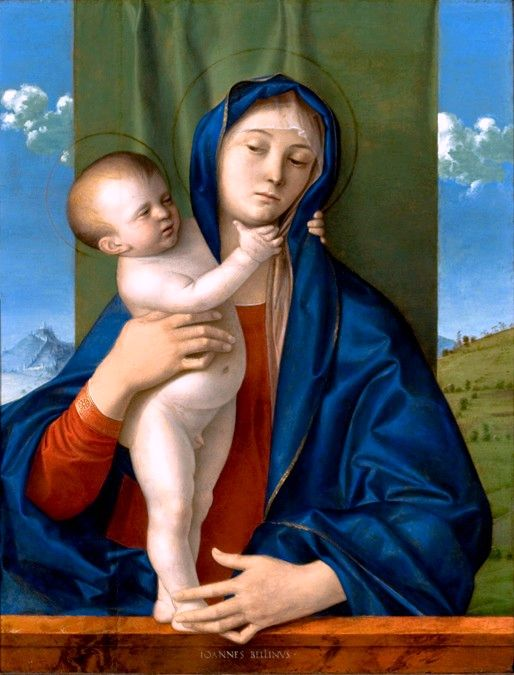
Bellini, Giovanni ~ Madonna Willys, 1480–1490, oil on panel, São Paulo Art Museum

Imago Pietatis, 1460–1469

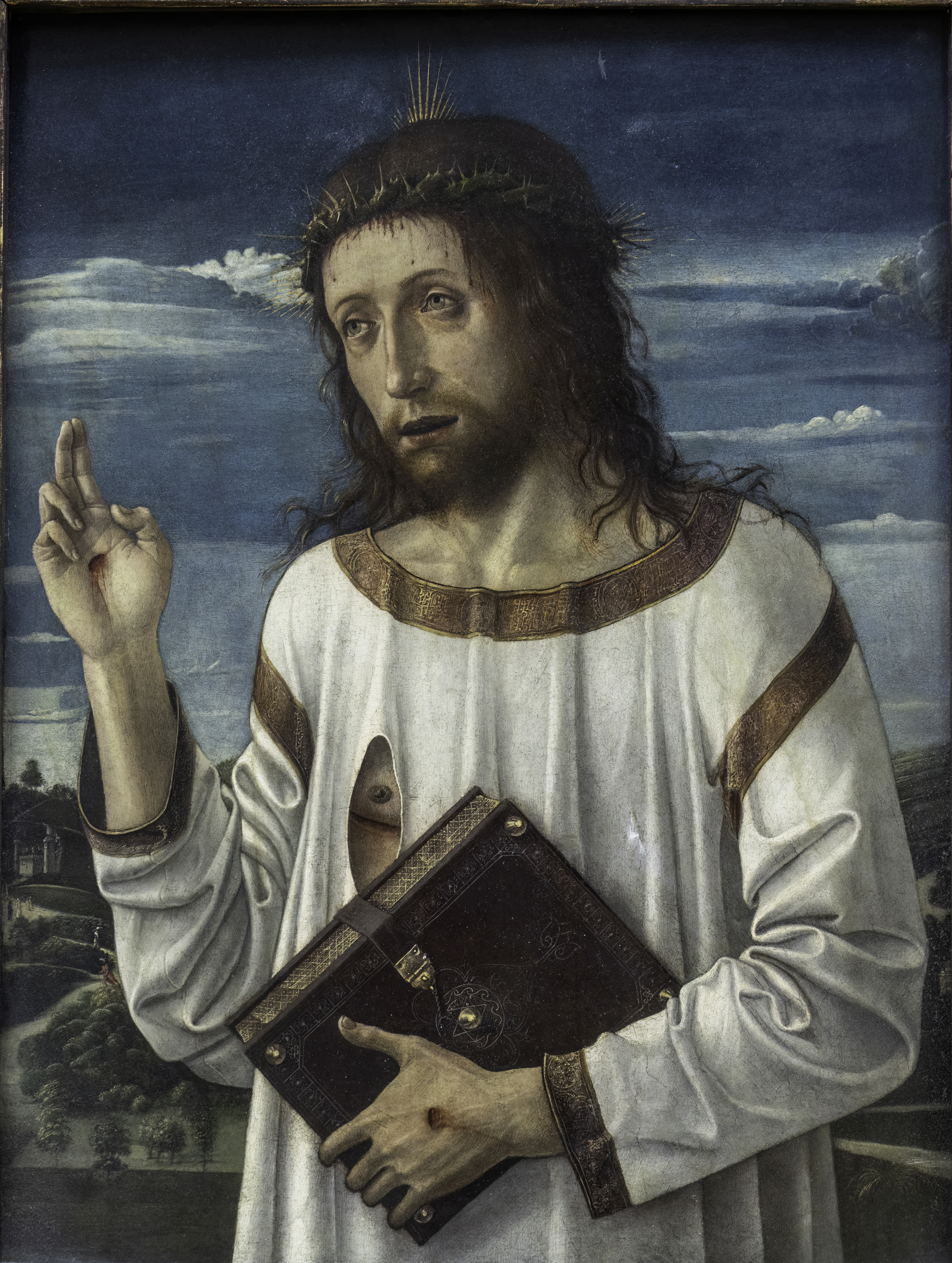
Blessing Christ, 1465–1470, Louvre, Paris (The tunic hem is extensively decorated with pseudo-Kufic; see detail)

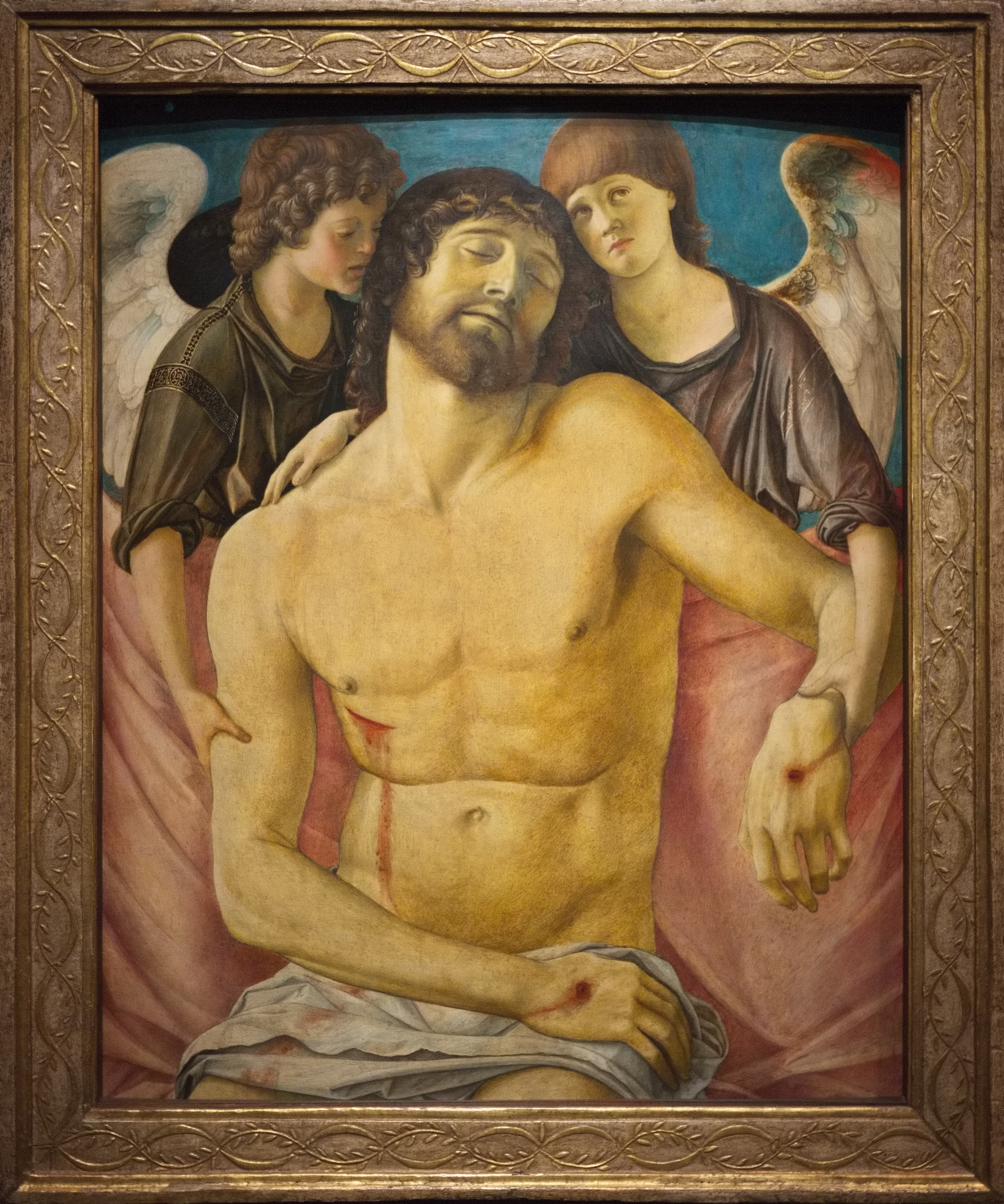
Dead Christ Tended by Angels, 1470–1475, Gemäldegalerie, Berlin
Portraits and allegorical works

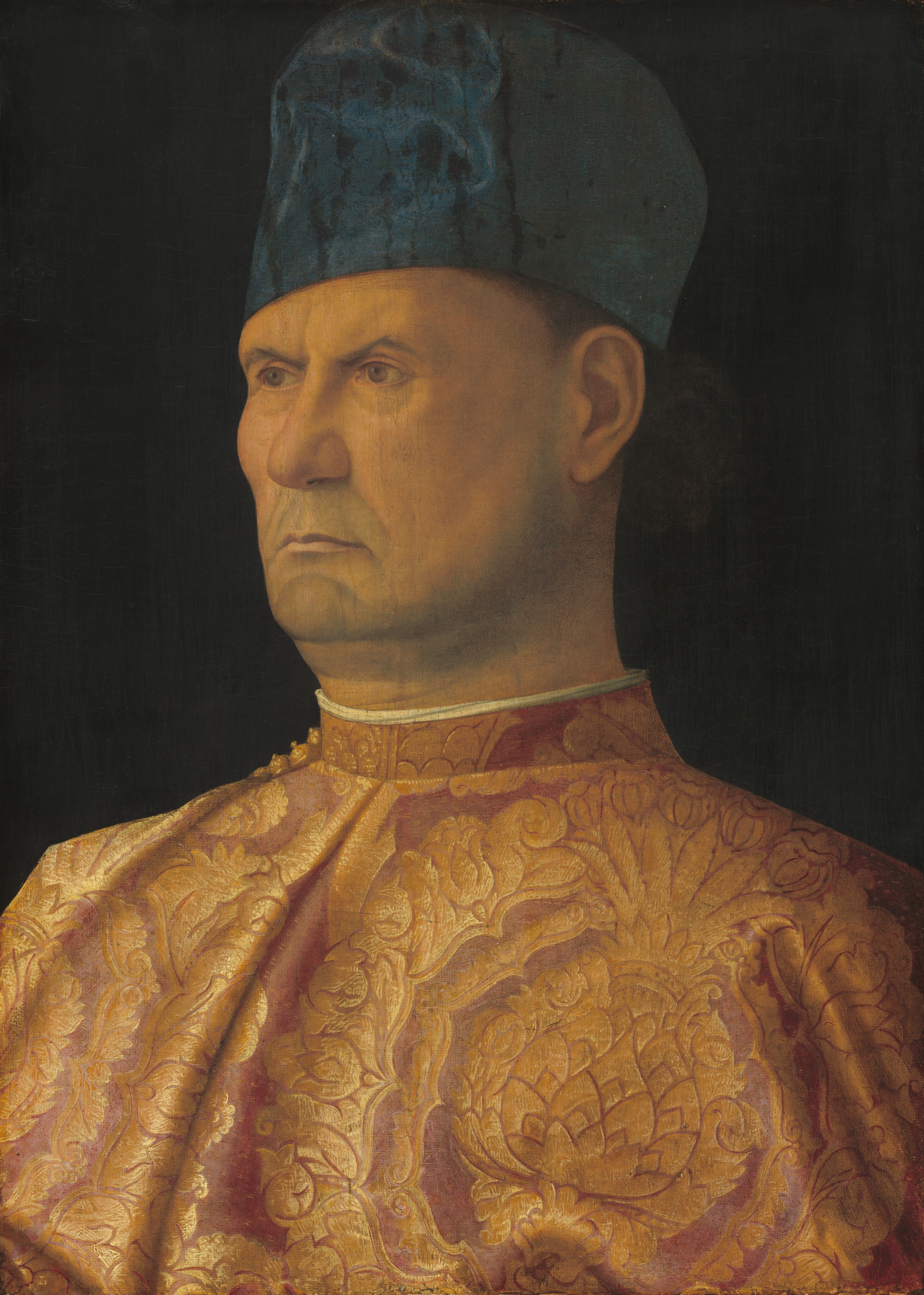
Bartolomeo d'Alviano

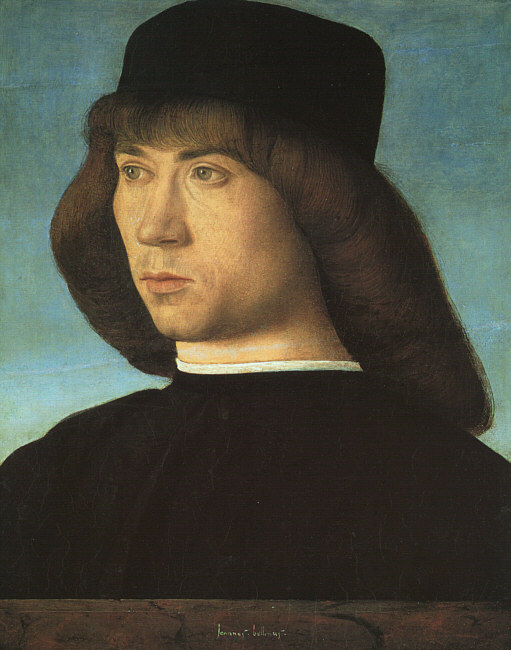
Portrait of a Young Man, National Gallery of Art, Washington DC

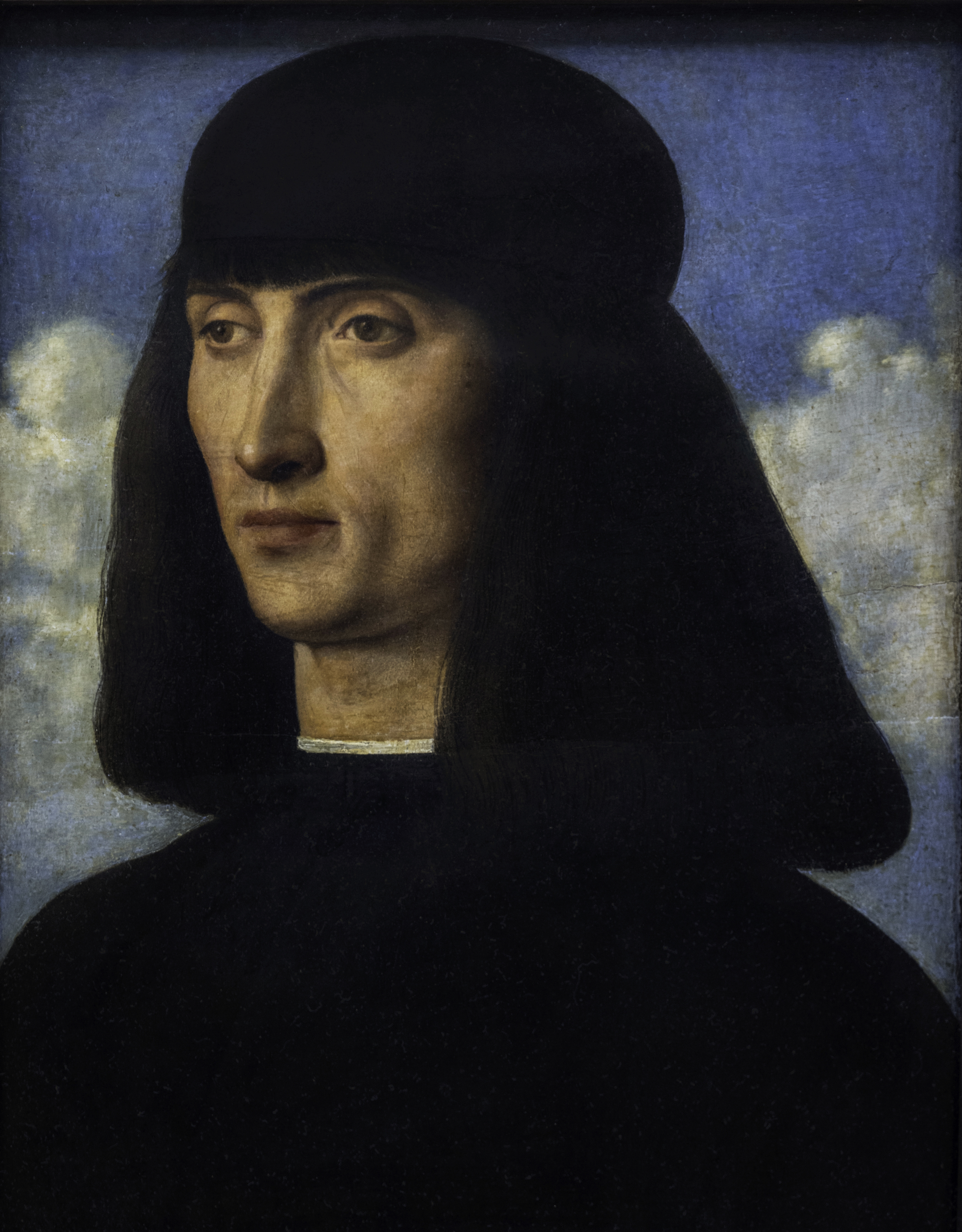
Portrait of a Man

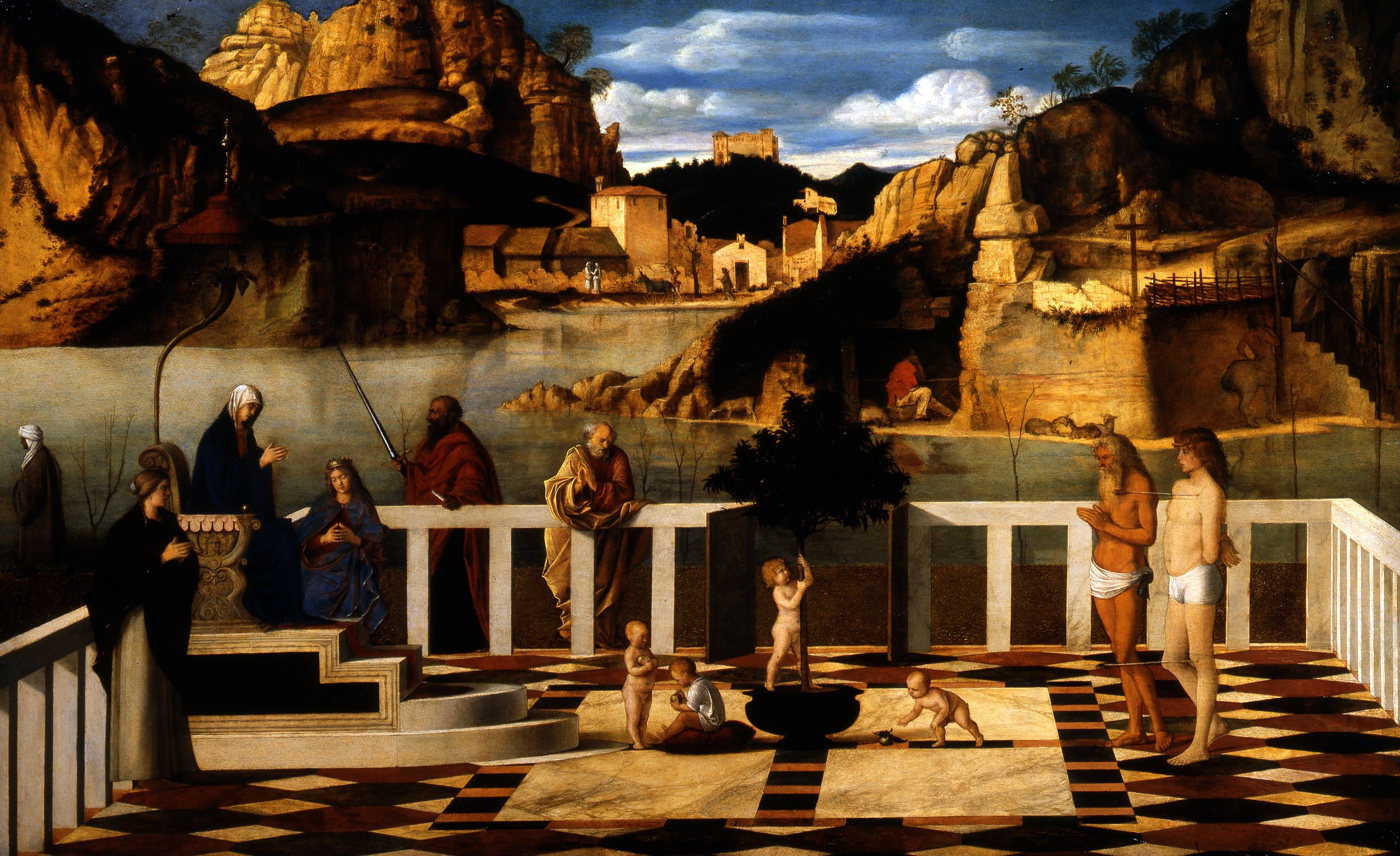
Holy Allegory, Uffizi, Florence
