= Portrait of Fra Teodoro of Urbino as Saint Dominic =

1515 painting by Giovanni Bellini

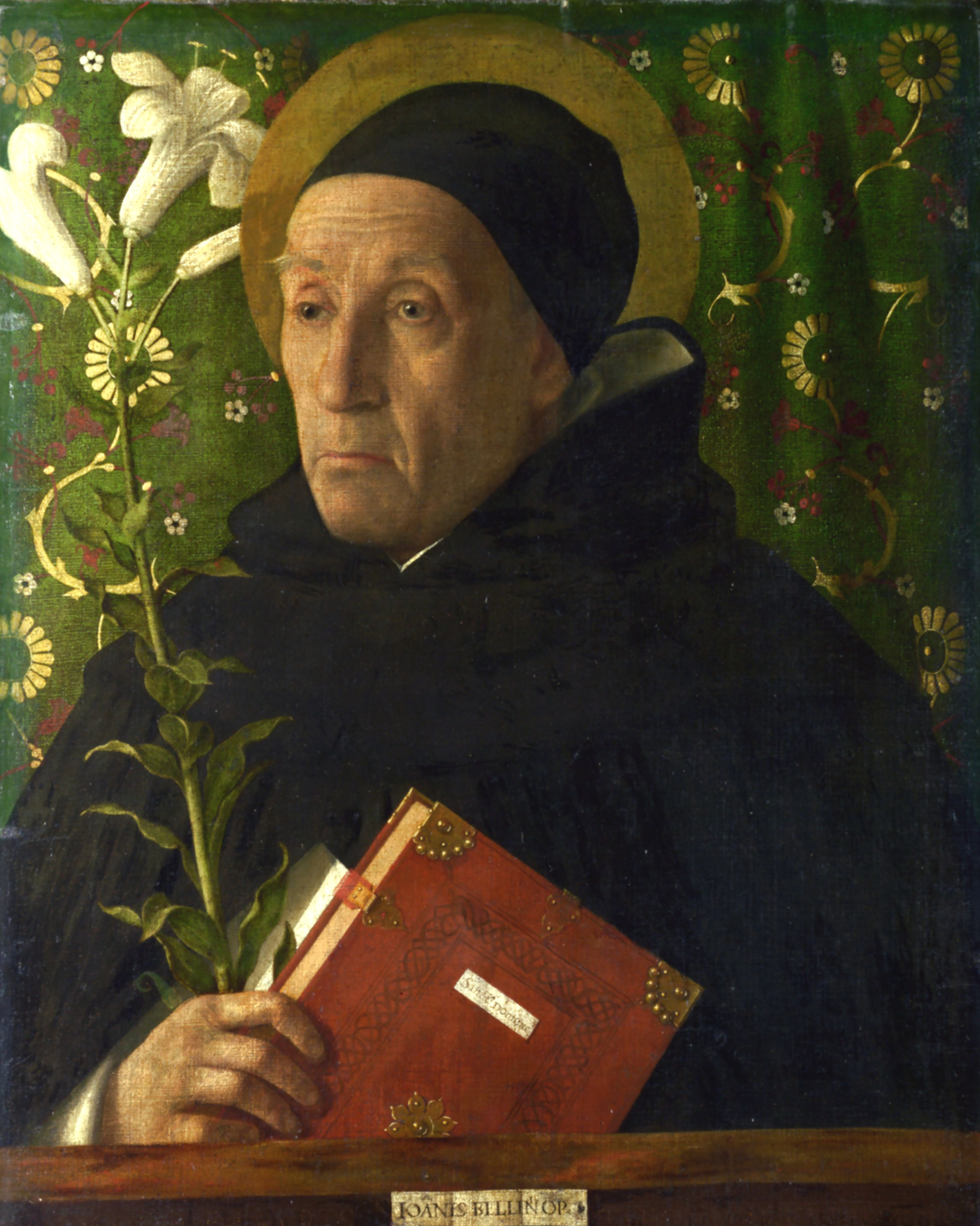
- Artist: Giovanni Bellini and workshop
- Year: 1515
- Medium: oil on canvas
- Dimensions: 63.9 cm × 49.5 cm (25.2 in × 19.5 in)
- Location: Victoria and Albert Museum, London
- Website: Catalogue entry

Portrait of Fra Teodoro of Urbino as Saint Dominic is an oil painting on canvas by the Italian Renaissance master Giovanni Bellini, dating to 1515. His final portrait, it is in the collection of the Victoria and Albert Museum in London, from which it is on long-term loan to the National Gallery in the same city. It depicts an old prelate with the attributes of Saint Dominic, including an austere black cap and a white lily.

Today, the portrait is often used to represent the medieval German theologian Meister Eckhart, despite a lack of connection between the portrait's subject and Eckhart.

== See also ==
- List of works by Giovanni Bellini

== Bibliography ==
- Olivari, Mariolina (2007), "Giovanni Bellini", Pittori del Rinascimento, by AA.VV. (in Italian), Florence: Scala, ISBN 978-8881170999
