= Enthroned Madonna Adoring the Sleeping Christ Child =

Painting by Giovanni Bellini

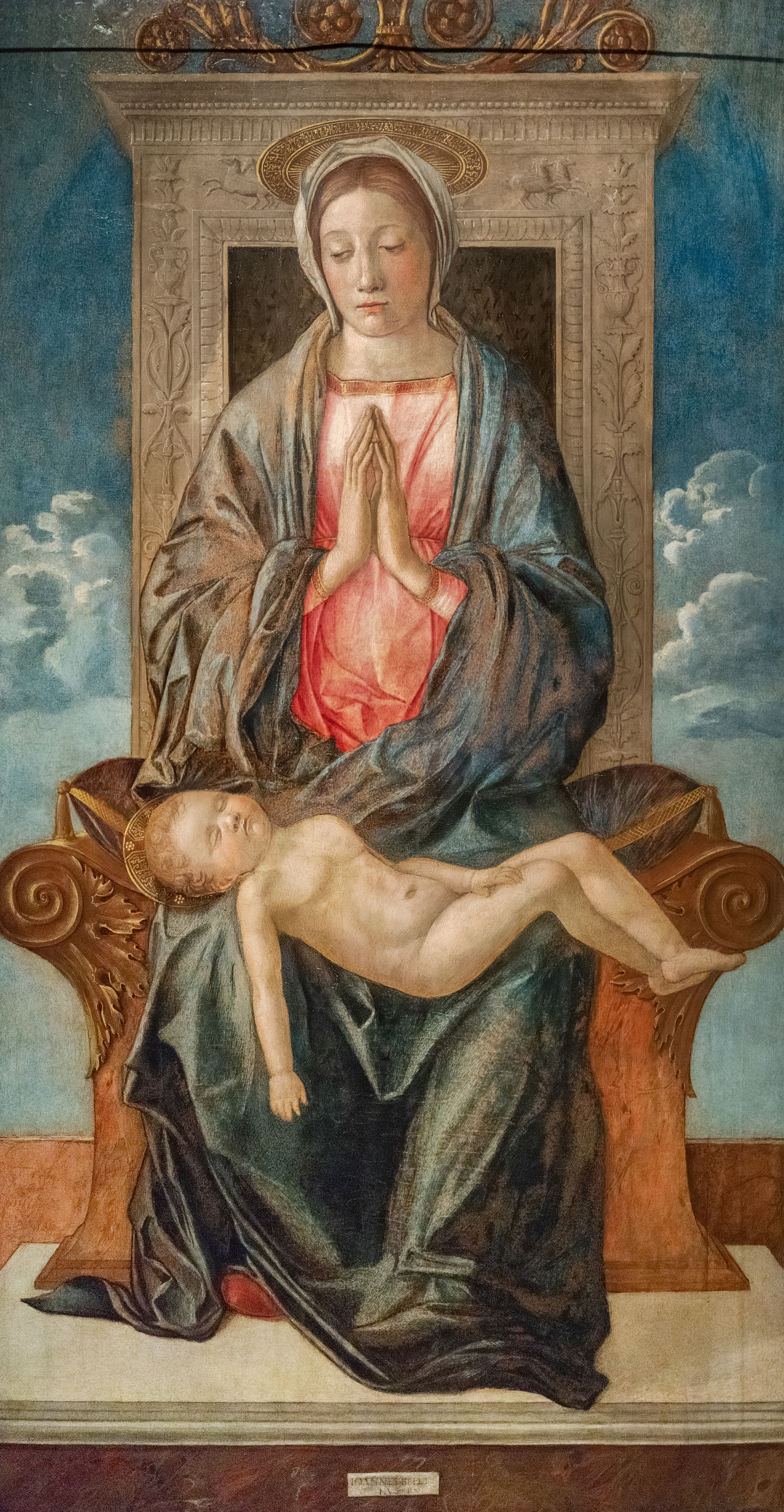
- Artist: Giovanni Bellini
- Year: 1475
- Medium: tempera on panel
- Dimensions: 120 cm × 65 cm (47 in × 26 in)
- Location: Gallerie dell'Accademia, Venice

Enthroned Madonna Adoring the Sleeping Christ Child (Italian: Madonna in trono che adora il Bambino dormiente) is a 1475 tempera-on-panel painting by the Italian Renaissance artist Giovanni Bellini, now in the Gallerie dell'Accademia in Venice, which acquired it in 1812.

== See also ==
- List of works by Giovanni Bellini
