= Madonna and Child with the Infant Saint John the Baptist (Bellini) =

Painting by Giovanni Bellini

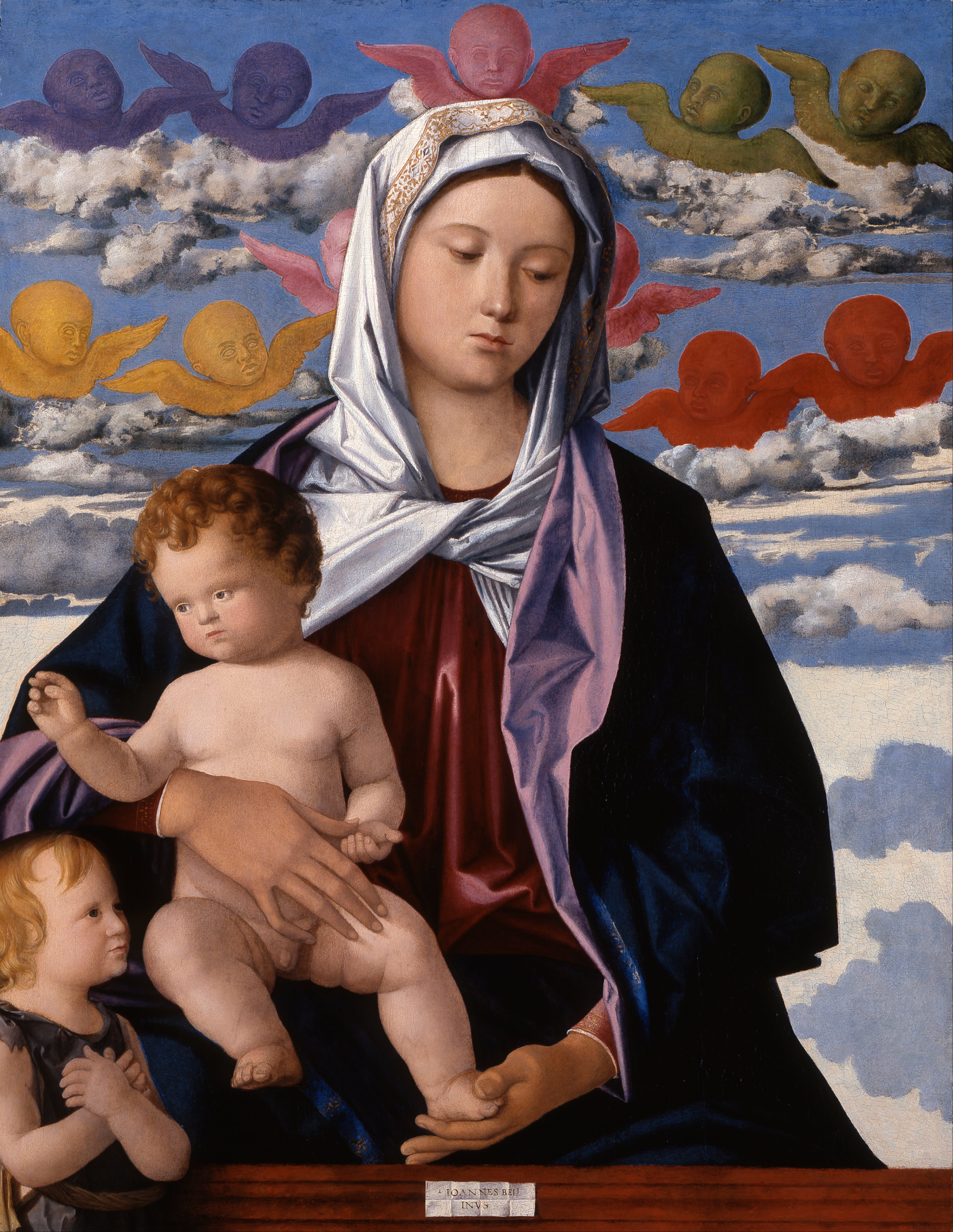
- Artist: Giovanni Bellini
- Year: c. 1490–1500
- Medium: Oil on panel
- Dimensions: 76.2 cm × 58.4 cm (30.0 in × 23.0 in)
- Location: Indianapolis Museum of Art

Madonna and Child with the Infant Saint John the Baptist is a painting in tempera and oils of c. 1490–1500 by Giovanni Bellini, probably with some additions by his studio assistants. It is now in the Indianapolis Museum of Art, which acquired it in 2003. It measures 76.2 × 58.4 cm.

== See also ==
- List of works by Giovanni Bellini
