= Madonna and Child (Bellini, Venice, 1475) =

1475 painting by Giovanni Bellini

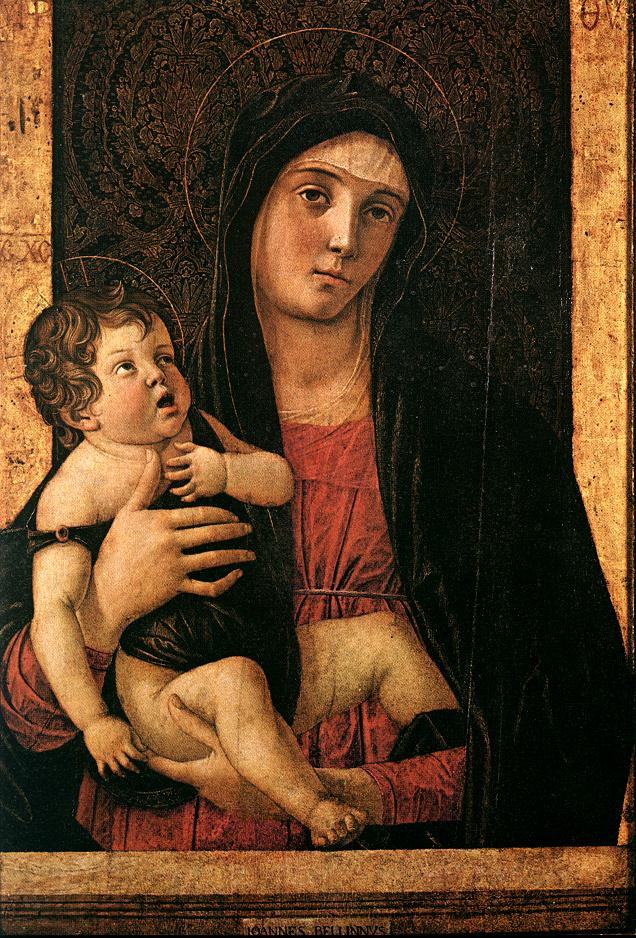
Madonna and Child, Santa Maria dell'Orto

Madonna and Child is a 1475 tempera-on-panel painting by the Italian Renaissance artist Giovanni Bellini. It was stolen from Madonna dell'Orto in Venice on 1 March 1993. Barbara de Dozsa, who claimed her ex-husband had legitimately purchased the painting in 1975, agreed to return the painting in July 2025. It measures 75 cm by 50 cm.

== See also ==
- List of works by Giovanni Bellini
