= The Blood of the Redeemer =

Painting by Giovanni Bellini

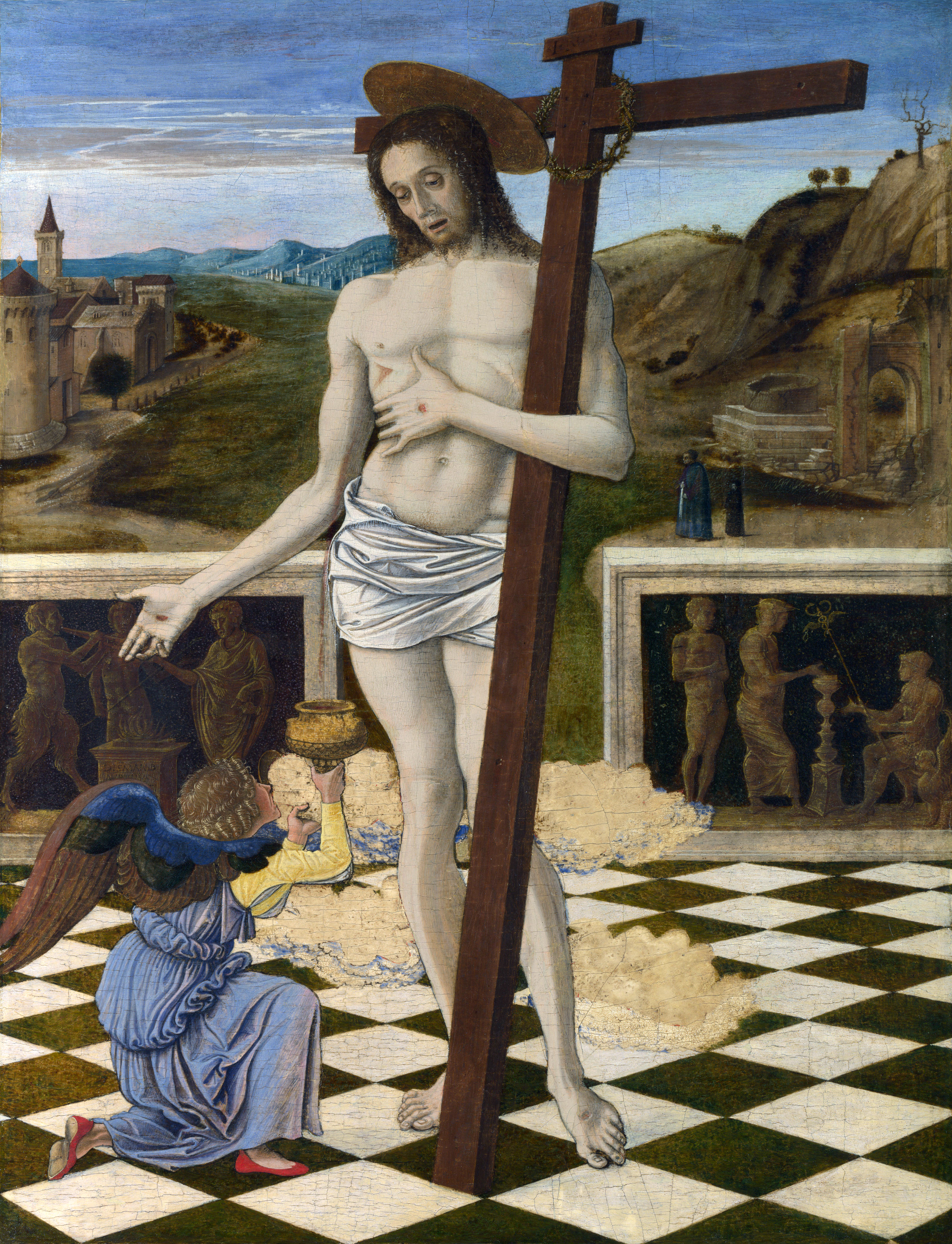
- Artist: Giovanni Bellini
- Year: 1460–65 (?)
- Medium: Tempera on panel
- Dimensions: 47 cm × 34.3 cm (19 in × 13.5 in)
- Location: National Gallery, London
- Website: Catalogue entry

The Blood of the Redeemer is a tempera painting on panel executed c. 1460–1465 by the Italian Renaissance artist Giovanni Bellini. It is now in the National Gallery, London.

It shows a young Christ holding his cross and an angel collecting the blood from the wound in his side in a chalice similar to that used at mass. This indicates that the work was perhaps originally used as the door to a church tabernacle. There were other angels behind Christ, but these were later painted out with clouds for unknown reasons. In the background are two bas reliefs in ancient Roman style, whose imagery may relate to the painting's themes and meanings.

== See also ==
- List of works by Giovanni Bellini
