= Madonna and Child (Bellini, New York, 1485–1490) =

Painting by Giovanni Bellini

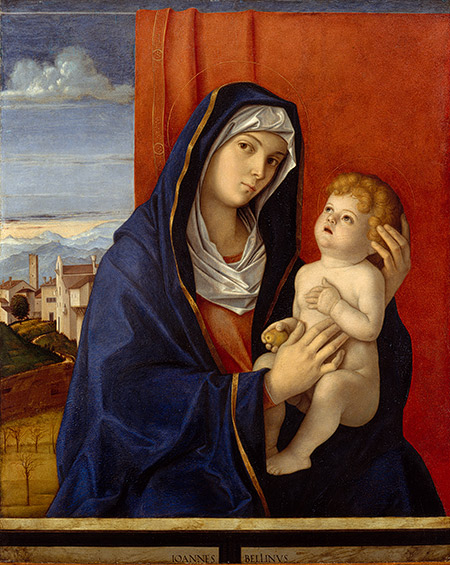
- Artist: Giovanni Bellini
- Year: late 1480s
- Medium: oil on panel
- Dimensions: 88.9 cm × 71.1 cm (35.0 in × 28.0 in)
- Location: Metropolitan Museum of Art, New York
- Accession: 08.183.1
- Website: Catalogue entry

Madonna and Child is a late 1480s painting by the Italian Renaissance master Giovanni Bellini, now in the Metropolitan Museum of Art in New York

Unusually, the Madonna holds the viewer's attention with her gaze. The backdrop curtain is pulled slightly open to reveal a distant landscape showing a transition from barren hills to a verdant townscape, a metaphor for resurrection.

== See also ==
- List of works by Giovanni Bellini
