= Lochis Madonna (Bellini) =

Painting by Giovanni Bellini

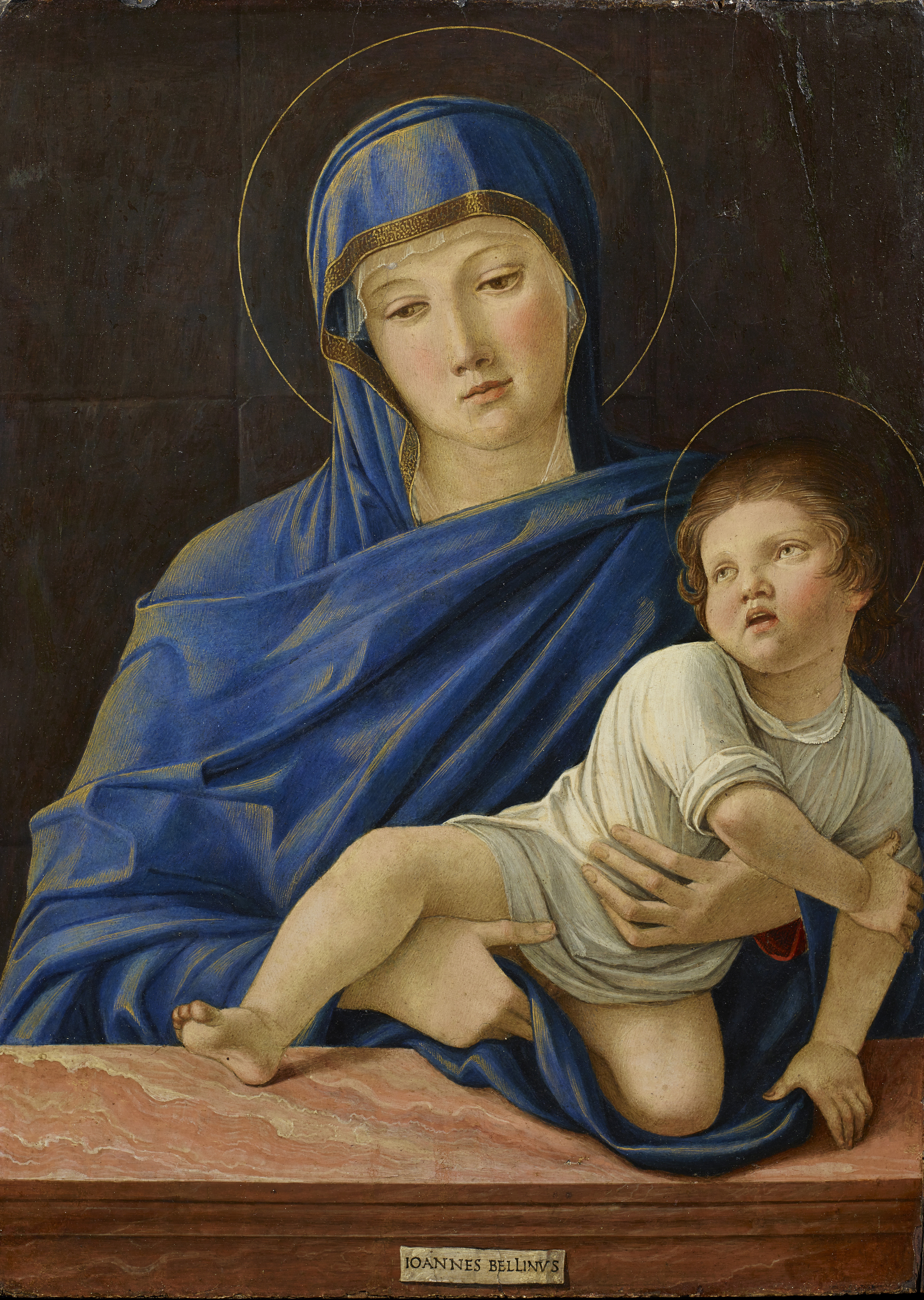
- Artist: Giovanni Bellini
- Year: 1476
- Medium: tempera on panel
- Dimensions: 47 cm × 34 cm (19 in × 13 in)
- Location: Accademia Carrara, Bergamo
- Website: Catalogue entry

The Lochis Madonna is a c.1475 tempera-on-panel painting by the Italian Renaissance painter Giovanni Bellini, now in the Accademia Carrara in Bergamo. It is signed IOANNES BELLINVS on a small scroll attached to the marble balustrade in the lower foreground. It dates from early in the painter's mature phase, although he was still influenced by Andrea Mantegna's sculptural approach to drapery in the painting.

== See also ==
- List of works by Giovanni Bellini
