= Head of the Redeemer =

1500–1502 painting by Giovanni Bellini

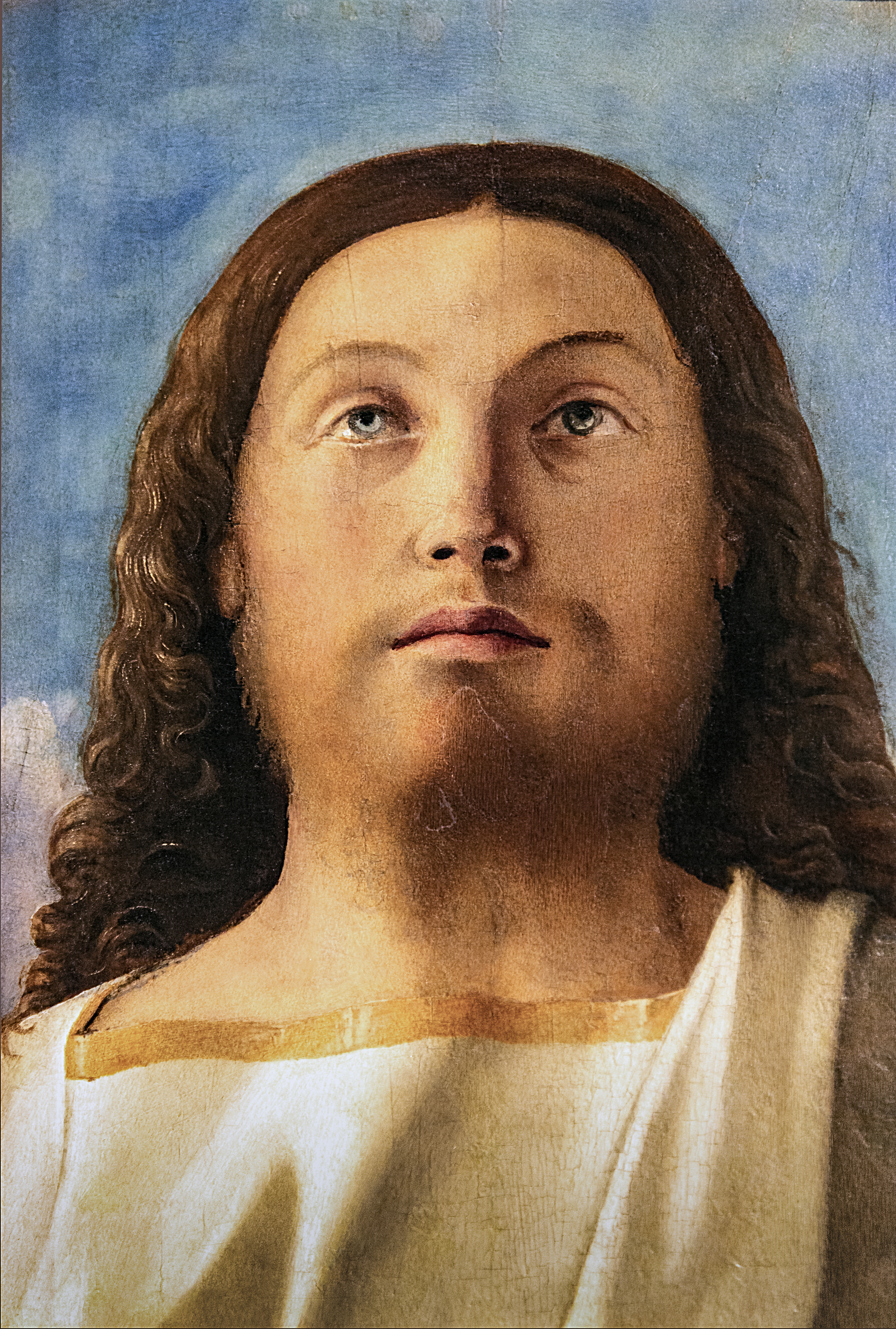
- Artist: Giovanni Bellini
- Year: 1500–1502
- Medium: oil on panel
- Dimensions: 33 cm × 22 cm (13 in × 8.7 in)
- Location: Gallerie dell'Accademia, Venice
- Website: WGA entry

Head of the Redeemer is a 33×22 cm oil-on-panel painting of the head of Christ by the Italian Renaissance master Giovanni Bellini, dating to 1500–1502 and now in the Gallerie dell'Accademia in Venice. It is a fragment of a larger scene of the Transfiguration; another fragment from the same work bears a scroll with the signature IOANNES BELLINUS ME PINXIT ("Giovanni Bellini painted me").

== See also ==
- List of works by Giovanni Bellini
