= Portrait of a Young Man (Bellini, Paris) =

Painting by Giovanni Bellini

Portrait of a Man
- Portrait of a Young Man
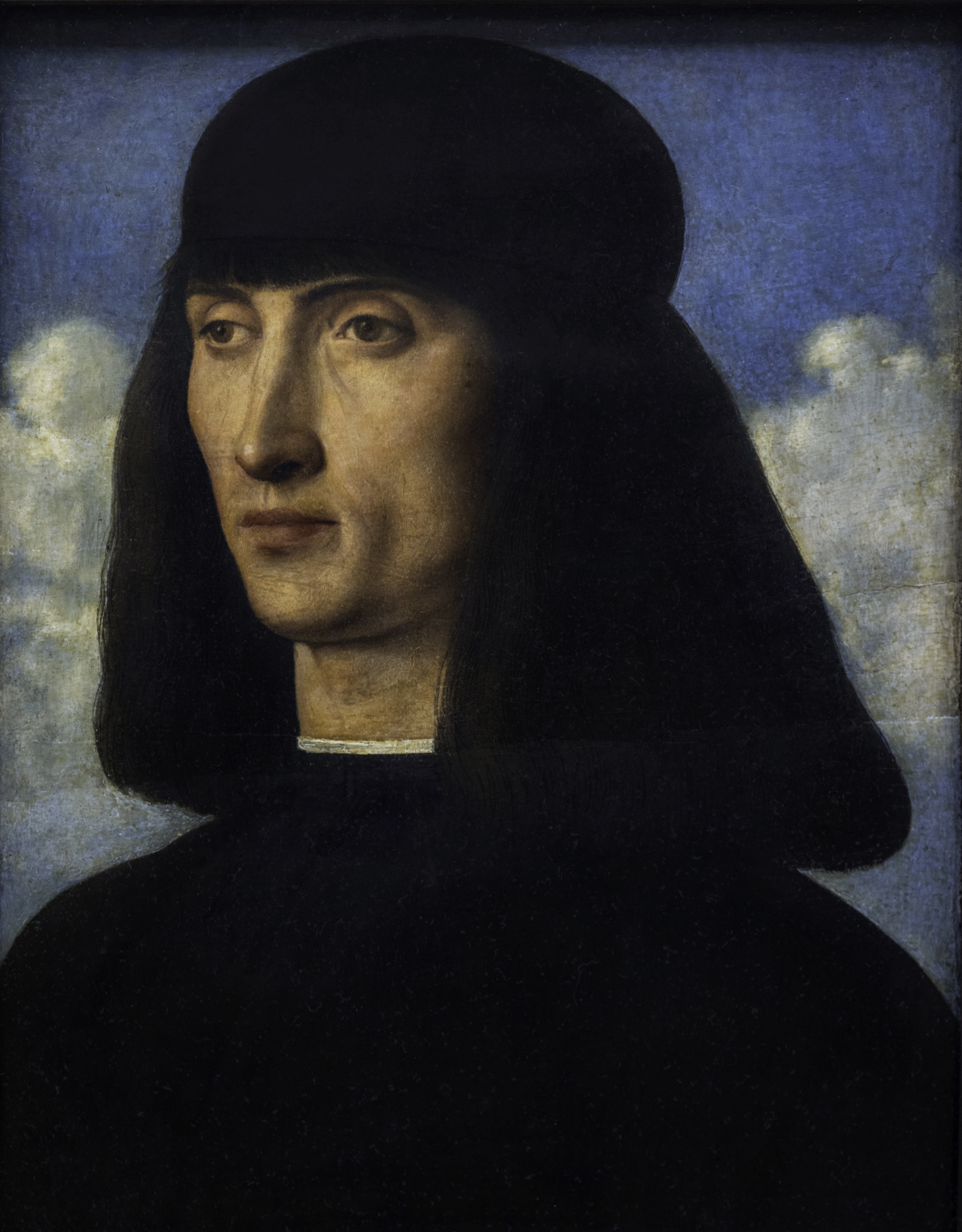
- Artist: Giovanni Bellini
- Year: c. 1490–1495
- Medium: oil paint, poplar panel
- Dimensions: 32.8 cm (12.9 in) × 25.5 cm (10.0 in) × 3.8 cm (1.5 in)
- Location: Room 710, France
- Owner: Louis-Alfred Caroillon de Vandeul, Louvre
- Collection: Department of Paintings of the Louvre
- Identifiers: Joconde work ID: 000PE024684

Portrait of a Young Man is a 32×26 cm oil-on-panel portrait painting by the Italian Renaissance master Giovanni Bellini, dating to c.1490–1495 and now in the Louvre in Paris, to whom it was given by comte Albert de Vandeul in 1902.

== See also ==
- List of works by Giovanni Bellini
