= Saint Jerome Reading in a Landscape (Bellini, London) =

Painting by Giovanni Bellini or a follower

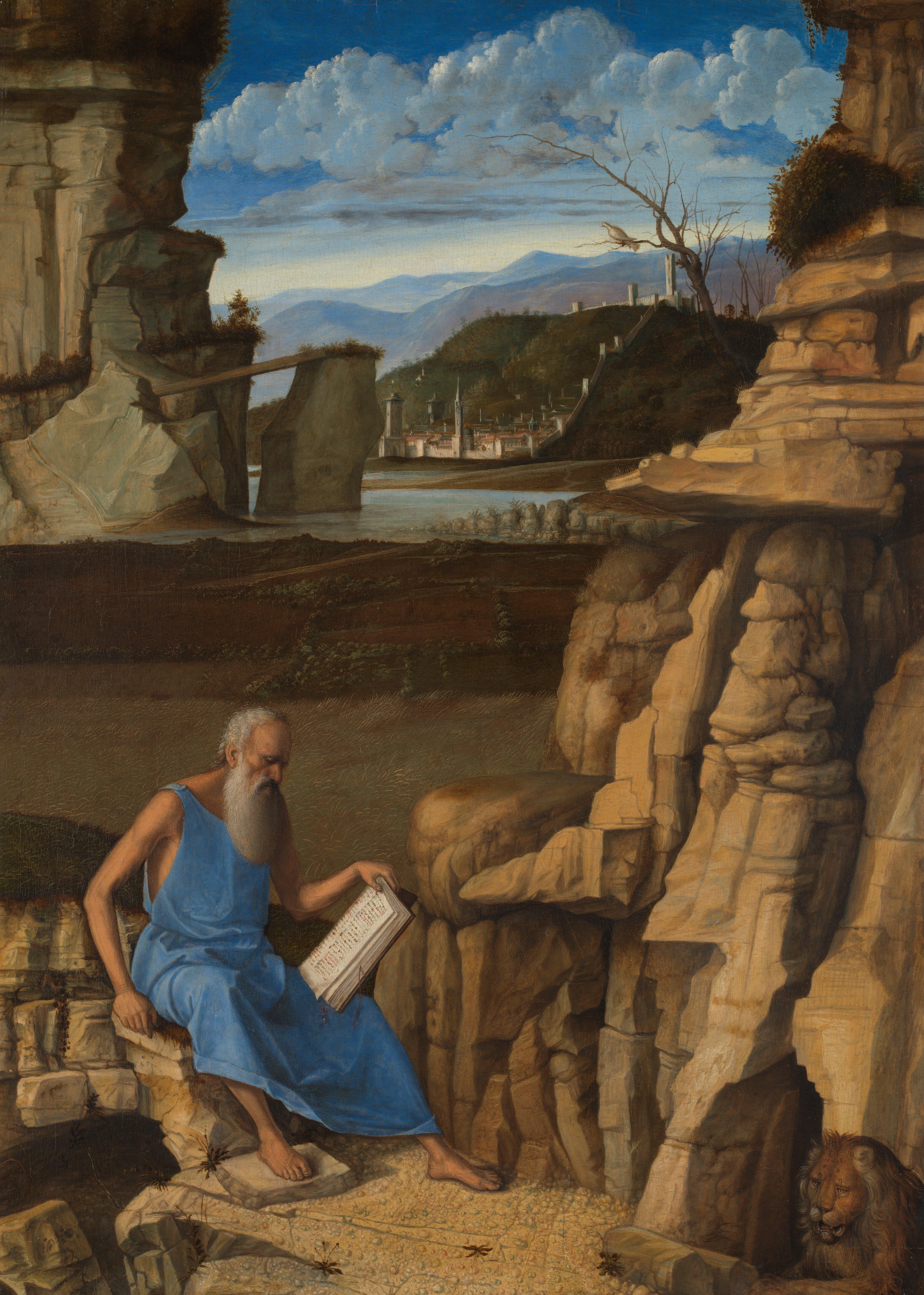
- Artist: Giovanni Bellini
- Year: 1480–1485 (?)
- Medium: oil and tempera on panel
- Dimensions: 47 cm × 33.7 cm (19 in × 13.3 in)
- Location: National Gallery, London
- Website: Catalogue entry

Saint Jerome Reading in a Landscape is a painting in oil and tempera on panel by Giovanni Bellini or a follower, probably dating to between 1480 and 1485. One of several versions of the theme by the artist, it is now in the National Gallery, London.

It depicts Saint Jerome in the Syrian desert producing the Vulgate Bible, accompanied by the lion from whose paw he extracted a thorn. In the distance is a walled city.

== See also ==
- List of works by Giovanni Bellini
