= Portrait of a Young Man in Red =

Painting by Giovanni Bellini

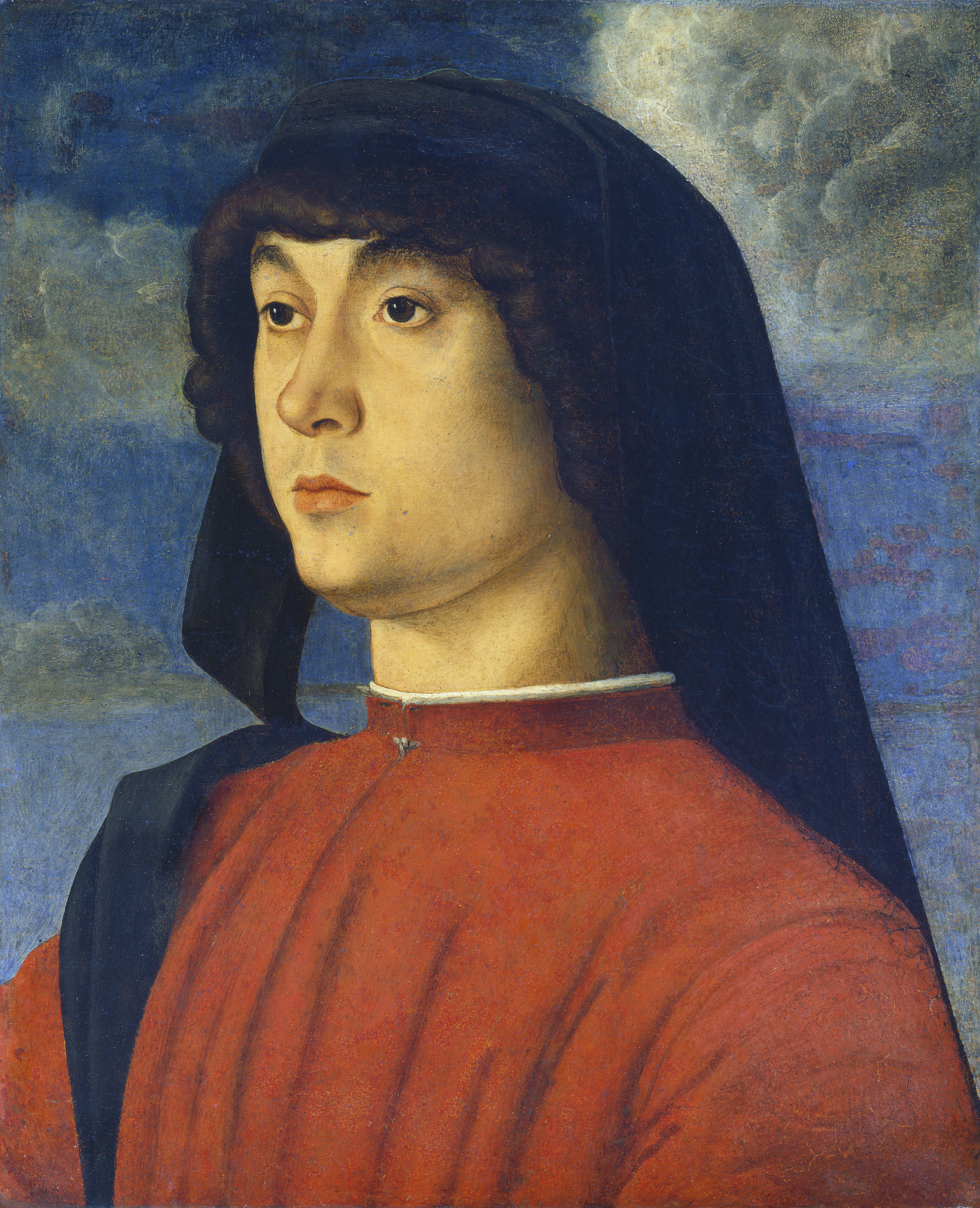
- Artist: Giovanni Bellini
- Year: 1485–1490
- Medium: oil on panel
- Dimensions: 32 cm × 26 cm (13 in × 10 in)
- Location: National Gallery of Art, Washington
- Website: Catalogue entry

Portrait of a Young Man in Red is an oil-on-panel portrait painted ca. 1485–1490 by the Italian Renaissance master Giovanni Bellini, now in the National Gallery of Art in Washington. He had been making portraits since 1474 and this is held to be one of his best in the genre, though its subject is unknown. It may have been in Andrea Vendramin's collection in Venice in 1627. It passed to count Manfredi von Ingenheim and was handed down to his heirs until 1930, when it was sold. Andrew W. Mellon then acquired it and it passed to the National Gallery of Art with the rest of his collection in 1937.

== See also ==
- List of works by Giovanni Bellini
