= Madonna Adoring the Sleeping Christ Child =

Painting by Giovanni Bellini

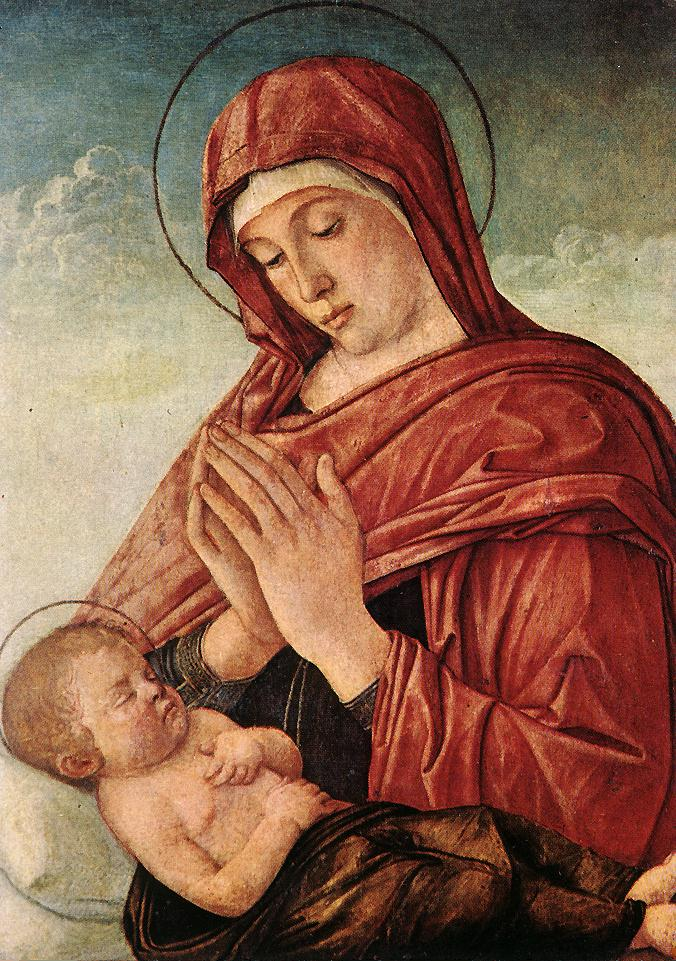
Madonna Adoring the Sleeping Christ Child

Madonna Adoring the Sleeping Christ Child is a c. 1475 tempera-on-panel painting by the Italian Renaissance artist Giovanni Bellini, measuring 77 cm by 56 cm. It forms part of the Contini Bonacossi Collection within the Uffizi Gallery in Florence.

== See also ==
- List of works by Giovanni Bellini
