= Dead Christ Supported by Two Angels (Bellini, Berlin) =

Painting by Giovanni Bellini

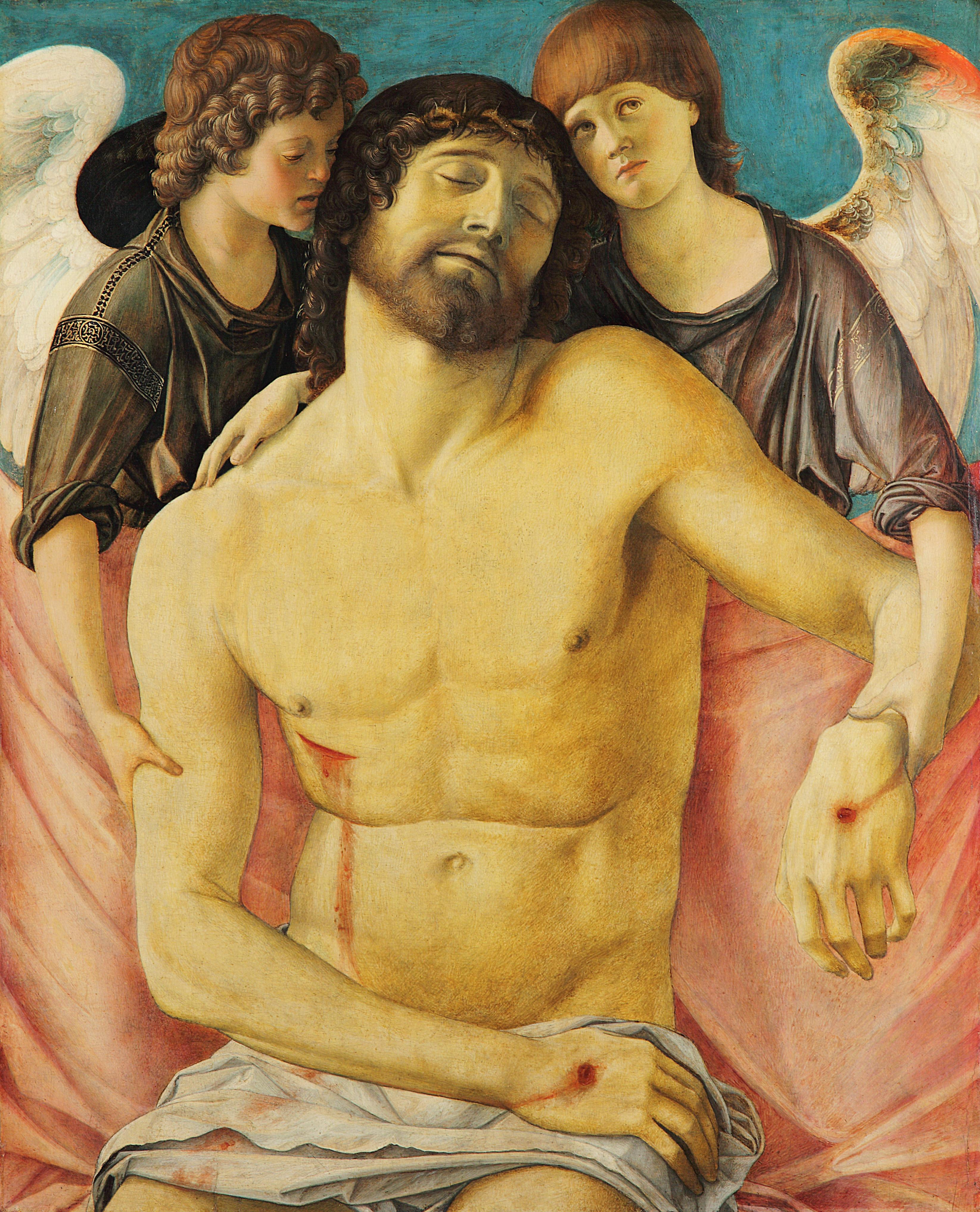
- Artist: Giovanni Bellini
- Year: 1465–1470
- Medium: Tempera on panel
- Dimensions: 83 cm × 68 cm (33 in × 27 in)
- Location: Gemäldegalerie, Berlin

Dead Christ Supported by Two Angels is a tempera painting on panel by the Italian Renaissance painter Giovanni Bellini, now in the Gemäldegalerie, Berlin. It is dated to 1465–1470, as shown by similarities to his 1464 San Vincenzo Ferrer Polyptych, an early mature work.

== Bibliography ==
- Mariolina Olivari, Giovanni Bellini, in AA.VV., Pittori del Rinascimento, Scala, Firenze 2007. ISBN 888117099X

== See also ==
- List of works by Giovanni Bellini
