= Portrait of a Gentleman =

Portrait of a Gentleman may refer to:

- Portrait of a Gentleman (El Greco) by El Greco
- Portrait of a Gentleman (Lotto) by Lorenzo Lotto
- Portrait of a Gentleman (Maíno) by Juan Bautista Maíno
- Portrait of a Gentleman (Mellin) by Claude Mellin
- Portrait of a Gentleman (Melone) by Altobello Melone
- Portrait of a Gentleman, Isaak Abrahamsz Massa by Frans Hals
- Portrait of a Gentleman Skating by Gilbert Stuart
- Portrait of a Gentleman Wearing Lynx Fur by Paolo Veronese
- Portrait of a Gentleman in a Fur by Paolo Veronese
- Portrait of a Gentleman with a Letter by Moretto da Brescia
- Portrait of a Gentleman with a Lion Paw by Lorenzo Lotto

== See also ==
- Portrait of a Man (disambiguation)
- Portrait of a Young Man (disambiguation)
- Portrait of a Lady (disambiguation)
