= Portrait of a Young Man =

Portrait of a Young Man is a name given to many painted portraits in which the identity of the young male sitter has been lost to history. These include:

- Portrait of a Young Man (Masaccio), by Masaccio, c. 1425
- Portrait of a Young Man (Uccello), a c.1431-1436 tempera on panel painting
- Portrait of a Young Man (Botticelli, Pitti Palace), by Sandro Botticelli, c. 1470–1475
- Portrait of a Young Man (Botticelli, Washington), by Sandro Botticelli, c. 1482–1485
- Portrait of a Young Man (Botticelli, London), by Sandro Botticelli, c. 1483
- Portrait of a Young Man (Leonardo), usually known as Portrait of a Musician, by Leonardo da Vinci, c. 1483–1487
- Portrait of a Young Man in Red, by Giovanni Bellini, c. 1485–1490
- Portrait of a Young Man (Bellini, Liverpool), by Giovanni Bellini, c. 1490–1500
- Portrait of a Young Man (Bellini, Paris), by Giovanni Bellini, c. 1500
- Portrait of a Young Man (Bellini, Washington), by Giovanni Bellini, c. 1500
- Portrait of a Young Man (Bellini, Royal Collection), by Giovanni Bellini, c. 1505
- Portrait of a Young Man (Lotto, Uffizi), by Lorenzo Lotto, c. 1506
- Portrait of a Young Man with a Lamp, by Lorenzo Lotto, c. 1506
- Portrait of a Young Man (Giorgione, Budapest), by Giorgione, c. 1508–1510
- Portrait of a Young Man (Raphael), by Raphael, c. 1513–1514
- Portrait of a Young Man (Rosso Fiorentino), a c.1517-1518 oil on canvas painting
- Portrait of a Young Man (Lotto, Gemäldegalerie), by Lorenzo Lotto, c. 1526
- Portrait of a Young Man (Lotto, Accademia), by Lorenzo Lotto, c. 1530
- Portrait of a Young Man, by Federico Barocci, c. 1580–1585
- Portrait of a Young Man with a Golden Chain, by Rembrandt, 1635
- Portrait of a Young Man (Iravani), by Mirza Kadym Irevani, mid-19th century

== See also ==
- Portrait of a Young Man with a Book (disambiguation), other paintings
- A Portrait of the Artist as a Young Man, a 1914–15 novel by James Joyce
  - A Portrait of the Artist as a Young Man (film), a 1977 film based on the book
- Portrait of a Young Man Drowning, a 1962 novel by Charles Perry
- Portrait of a Man (disambiguation)
