= Portrait of a Man =

Portrait of a Man may refer to:

== Paintings ==
Ordered chronologically

- Léal Souvenir or Portrait of a Man, a 1432 painting by Jan van Eyck
- Portrait of a Man (Self Portrait?), a 1433 painting by Jan van Eyck
- Portrait of a Man (Domenico Ghirlandaio), a c. 1448–1494 painting by Domenico Ghirlandaio
- Portrait of a Man (Mantegna), a c. 1460–1470 painting by Andrea Mantegna
- Portrait of a Man, a c. 1460-1478 series of male portraits by Antonello da Messina
- Portrait of a Man (Hans Memling), a c. 1470 oil on panel painting
- Portrait of a Man (Antonello da Messina, London), a c. 1476 painting by Antonello da Messina
- Portrait of a Man (Signorelli), a c. 1492 painting by Luca Signorelli
- Portrait of a Man (Raphael), a c. 1502 painting by Raphael
- A Man with a Quilted Sleeve or Portrait of a Man, a c. 1510–1520 painting by Titian
- Portrait of a Man (Titian, New York), a c. 1512 painting by Titian
- Portrait of a Man (Baldung), a 1514 oil on panel painting
- Portrait of a Man (Titian, Indianapolis), a c. 1515 male oil on canvas portrait
- Portrait of a Man (Rosso Fiorentino), a c. 1522 oil on panel painting
- Portrait of a Man (Moretto), a 1526 painting by Moretto da Brescia
- Portrait of a Man (Parmigianino), a c. 1530 oil on panel painting
- Portrait of Benedetto Varchi or Portrait of a Man, a c. 1540 oil painting by Titian
- Portrait of a Man (Lotto), a c. 1545 oil on canvas painting
- Laughing Cavalier or Portrait of a Man, a 1624 painting by Frans Hals
- Portrait of a Man (Velázquez), a c. 1630–1635 painting by Diego Velázquez
- Portrait of a Man (Rembrandt, New York), a c. 1657 portrait painting
- Portrait of a Man (Frans Hals, Frick), a c. 1660 painting by Frans Hals
- Jan Kupecký self portrait (Slovak National Gallery) or Portrait of a Man (Self-portrait), a 1700 painting by Jan Kupecký
- Portrait of a Man (Batoni), a 1774 painting by Pompeo Batoni

== Other works ==
- Portrait of a Man or Le Condottière, a 2012 posthumous novel by Georges Perec
- "Portrait of a Man", a song by Screamin' Jay Hawkins

== See also ==
- Portrait of a Man in Red Chalk, a c. 1510 chalk drawing by Leonardo da Vinci
- Portrait of a Man in a Top Hat, an 1882 graphite drawing by Vincent van Gogh
- Portrait of a Man in a Yellowish-Gray Jacket, a 1633 painting by Frans Hals
- Portrait of a Man, probably a Member of the Van Beresteyn Family, a 1632 painting by Rembrandt
- Portrait of a Man Rising from His Chair, a 1633 painting by Rembrandt
- Portrait of a Man with a Beer Jug, a c. 1630 painting by Frans Hals
- Portrait of a Man with a Blue Chaperon, a c. 1430 painting by Jan van Eyck
- Portrait of a Man with a Book, a c. 1522 painting by Antonio da Correggio
- Portrait of a Man with a Medal of Cosimo the Elder, a c. 1474–1475 painting by Sandro Botticelli
- Portrait of a Man with a Roman Medal, a c. 1480 painting by Hans Memling
- Portrait of a Man with Arms Akimbo, a 1658 painting by Rembrandt
- Portrait of a Man with Carnation, a c. 1436 painting by Jan van Eyck
- Portrait of a Man with Glove, a c. 1520 painting by Titian, which is commonly known as the Man with a Glove
- Portrait of a Young Man (disambiguation)
