= Portrait of a Young Senator =

15th-century painting by Giovanni Bellini

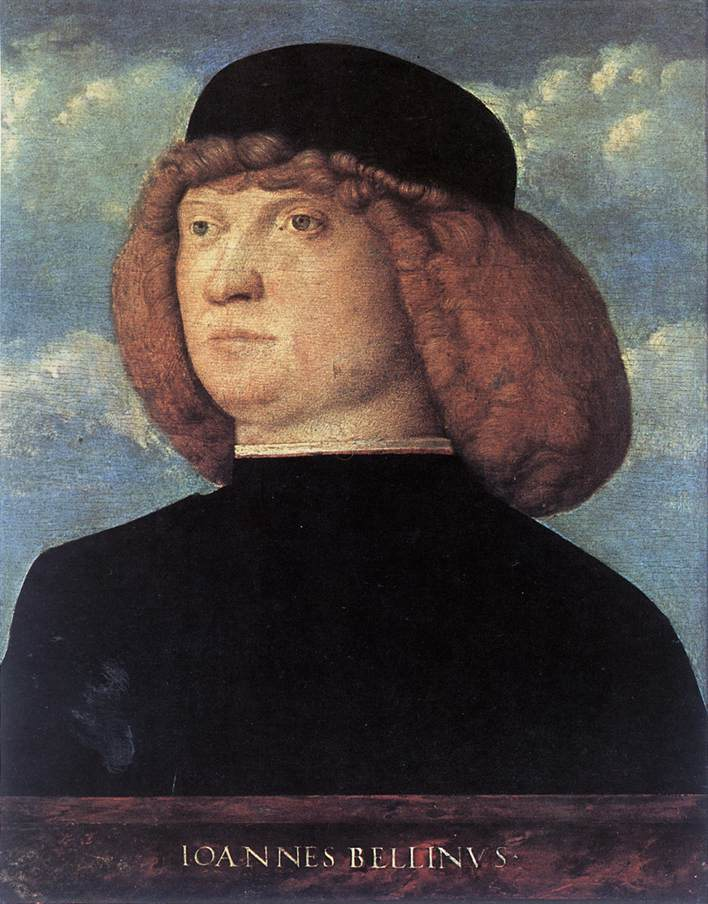
- Artist: Giovanni Bellini
- Year: c. 1490–1500
- Medium: oil on panel
- Dimensions: 31 cm × 26 cm (12 in × 10 in)
- Location: Galleria degli Uffizi, Florence

Portrait of a Young Senator is an oil-on-panel painting by the Italian Renaissance master Giovanni Bellini, dating to 1490–1500 and now in the Uffizi Gallery in Florence.

It was first recorded in a 1753 inventory as a self-portrait of the painter, based solely on the resemblance of a few elements to the confirmed self-portrait in the Galleria Capitolina. To date it, some have suggested comparisons with other portraits of young men by the artist, such as those in the Royal Collection and the Walker Art Gallery.

== See also ==
- List of works by Giovanni Bellini
