= Portrait of a Man in a Top Hat =

1882 drawing by Vincent van Gogh

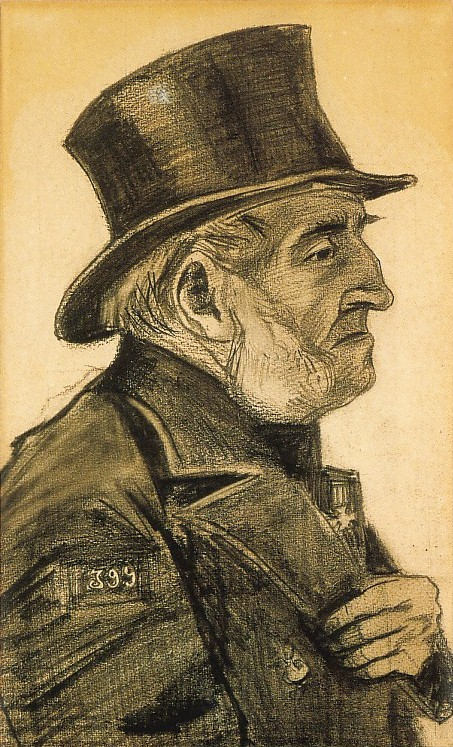
- Artist: Vincent van Gogh
- Year: December 1882
- Catalogue: F954; JH287
- Medium: paper, graphite
- Dimensions: 39.9 cm × 24.6 cm (15.7 in × 9.7 in)
- Location: Worcester Art Museum, Massachusetts

Portrait of a Man in a Top Hat is a drawing created in 1882 by Vincent van Gogh currently in Worcester Art Museum. It is one of Van Gogh's drawings depicting Adrianus Jacobus Zuyderland.

== See also ==
- Early works of Vincent van Gogh
- List of works by Vincent van Gogh
- Adrianus Jacobus Zuyderland (Van Gogh series)
