= Portrait of a Gentleman (Maíno) =

Painting by Juan Bautista Maíno

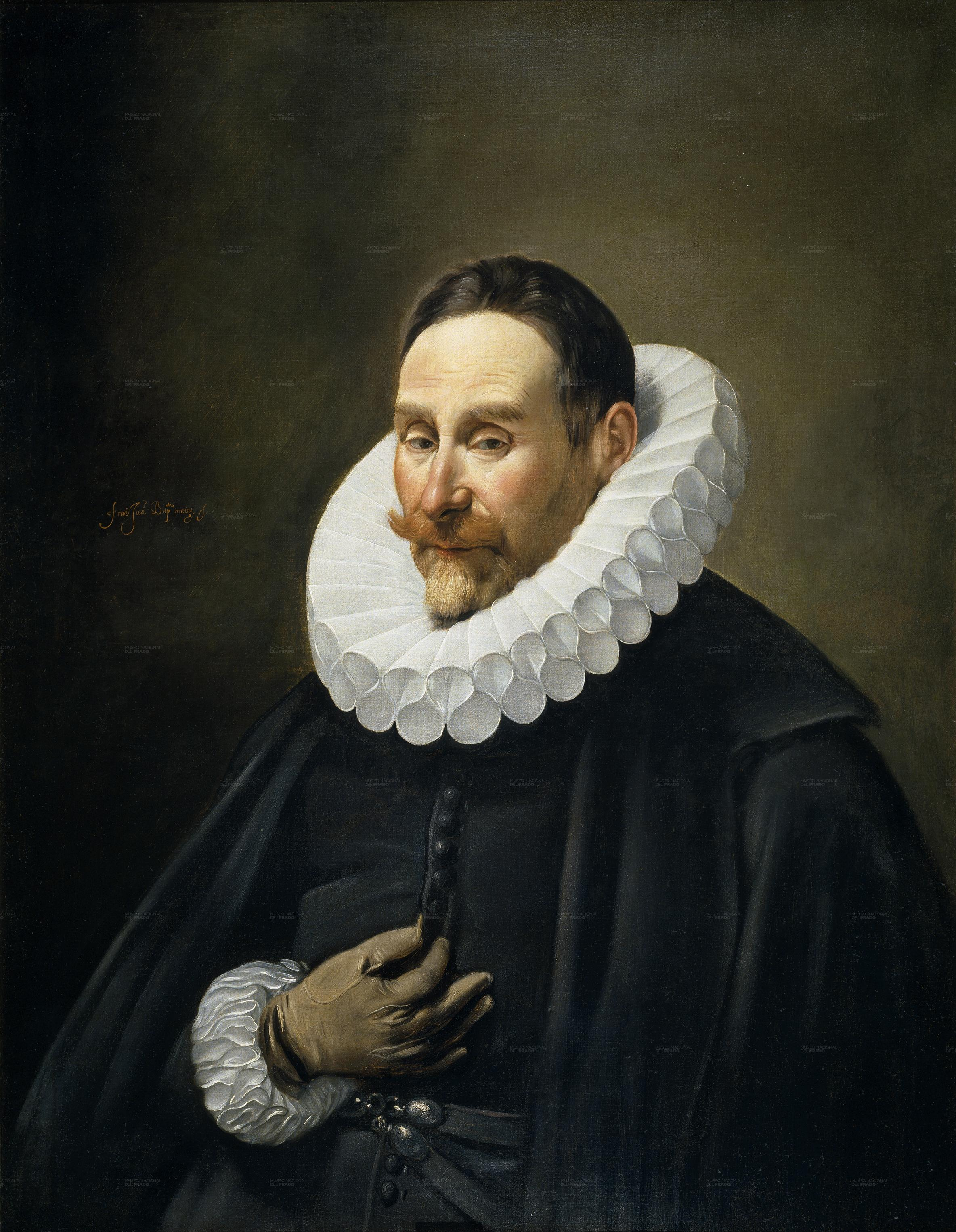
- Artist: Juan Bautista Maíno
- Year: 1618–1623
- Medium: Oil on canvas
- Dimensions: 96 cm × 76 cm (38 in × 30 in)
- Location: Museo del Prado, Madrid

Portrait of a Gentleman or Portrait of a Knight is a painting of 1618–1623 in oils on canvas by the Spanish artist Juan Bautista Maíno, in the Museo del Prado in Madrid.

It shows a knight, whose name is unknown, in a black doublet and cape and a large white ruff, lit from the side and shown three-quarter-length.
