= Portrait of a Man (Batoni) =

1774 painting by Pompeo Batoni

- Artist: Pompeo Batoni
- Year: 1774
- Medium: oil on canvas
- Dimensions: 101.3 cm × 74 cm (39.9 in × 29 in)
- Location: National Gallery, London
- Website: Catalogue entry

Portrait of a Man is a 1774 oil-on-canvas portrait by the Italian painter Pompeo Batoni, now in the National Gallery, London. It is traditionally identified as John Scott of Banks Fee near Stow-on-the-Wold, though this is not yet verified. Banks Fee was bought by a man named John Scott in 1753 and Charles Burney records a "Mr Scott" in Rome in 1770, the time and place where Batoni was active. However, it is not yet known if the two Scotts are one and the same and whether he is definitely the subject.
