= Portrait of a Young Man (Uccello) =

Painting by Paolo Uccello

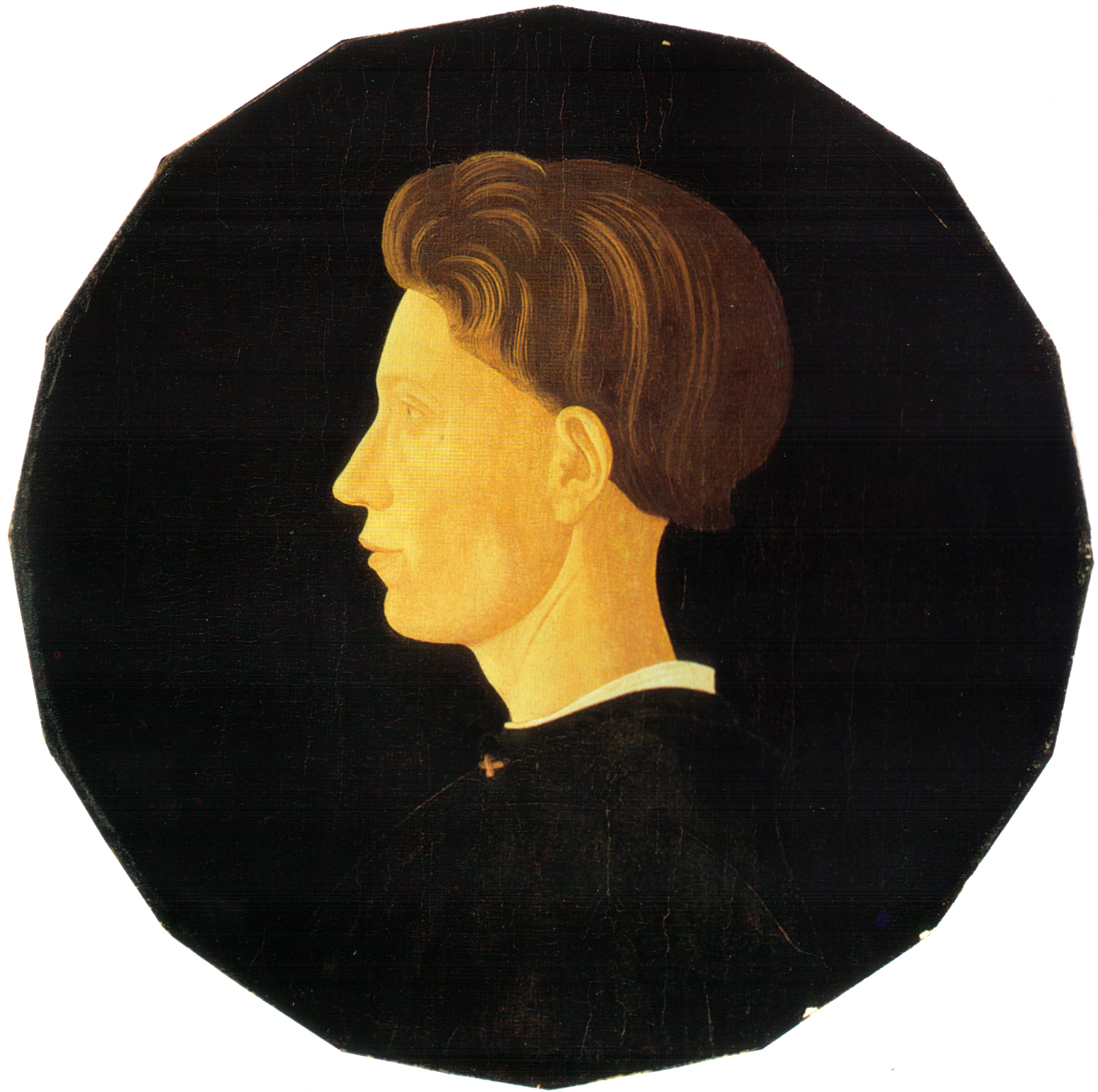
Portrait of a Young Man (c. 1431–1436) by Paolo Uccello

Portrait of a Young Man is a tempera on panel painting by Paolo Uccello, executed c. 1431–1436, now in the Indianapolis Museum of Art.

The work originated in a rectangular or square format and was only later (probably in the 19th century) cut down into its present polygonal format to render it rarer and more desirable to buyers. It is probably the only surviving portrait securely attributed to the artist, based on comparison with physical types in his fresco medallions in the Assunta Chapel at Prato Cathedral.
