= Portrait of a Man (Parmigianino) =

Painting by Parmigianino

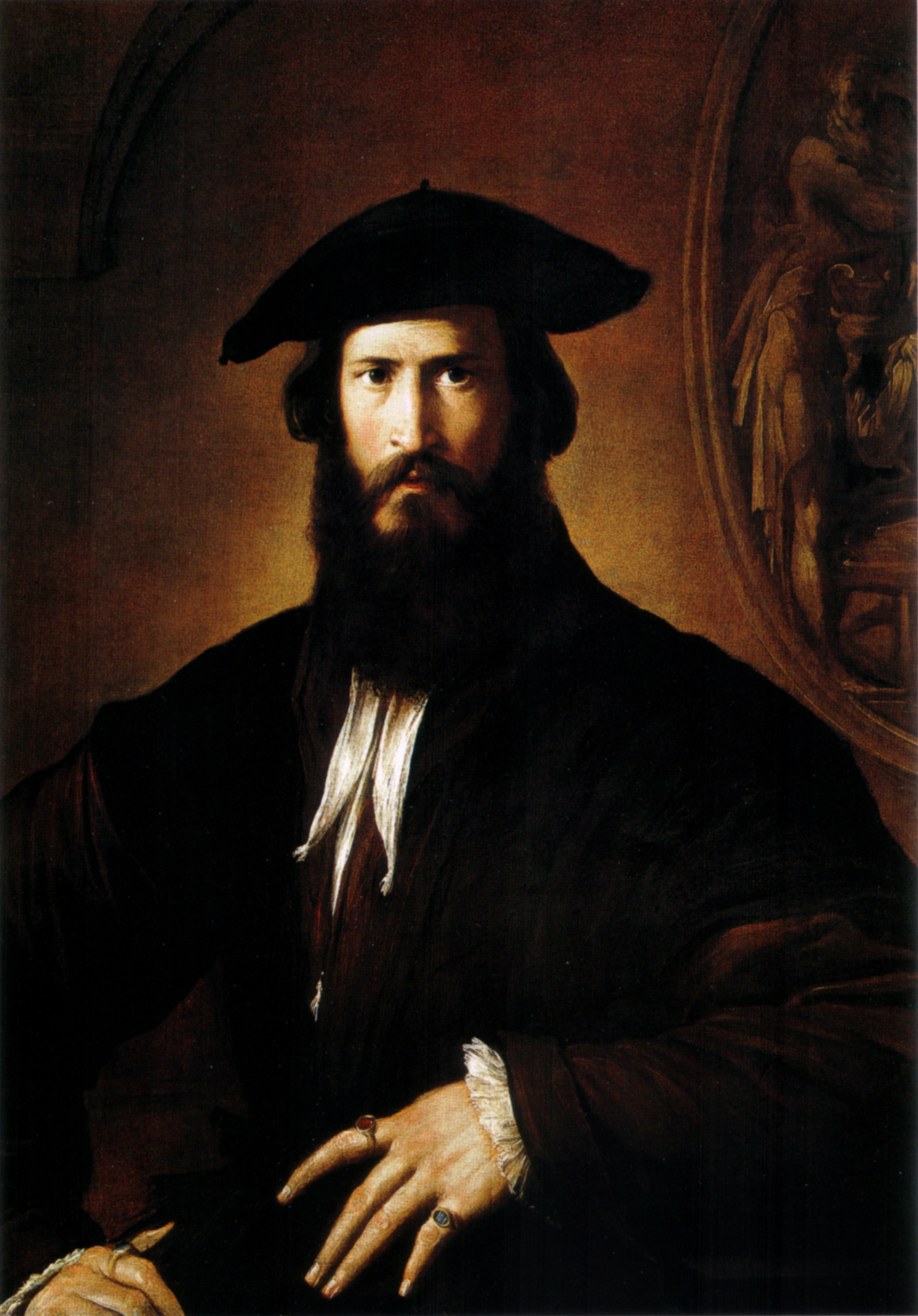
Portrait of a Man (c. 1530) by Parmigianino

Portrait of a Young Man is an oil on panel painting by Parmigianino, executed c. 1530, now in the Uffizi in Florence, whose collection it entered on 27 October 1682. Three copies survive in the Museo di Capodimonte (n. 201), Rome's Accademia di San Luca and the Galleria nazionale di Parma (n. 313, inscribed with the date "MDXX", which is probably also the date of the Uffizi work).

It has traditionally been identified as a self-portrait, as recorded by an inscription on the reverse. That identification was still current when it appeared in the 1773 Serie degli uomini più illustri nella pittura. It was in Florence at least by the time of Cosimo III and possibly earlier.

Later art historians from Ghidiglia Quintavalle and Fagiolo dell'Arco onwards dismissed this identification, particularly since the subject's face does not match more securely-identified self-portraits of the artist such as Self-portrait in a Convex Mirror (Kunsthistorisches Museum). It may instead be a Parmigianino portrait of Bonifacio Gozzadino mentioned by Vasari, or perhaps one of an "unknown Bolognese count", but there is no definite evidence for either identification.

More recently Freedberg (1950) and P. Rossi (1980) have argued in favour of the inscription's authenticity. They compare the painting with drawings which are probable self-portraits, particularly n. 790A in the Devonshire Collection at Chatsworth House (Self-Portrait and Study for the Frescoes at La Steccata), n. 2623 in the Albertina in Vienna (probably the source for the print of Vita di Francesco Mazzuoli by Vasari) and catalogue number 1858-7-24-6 in the British Museum (showing a man with a dog and with an inscription by Popham interpreting it as a self-portrait). They also refer to a late sixteenth century collection in a Parma private collection whose inscription refers to the painter.
