= Portrait of a Young Man Wearing Lynx Fur =

1560 painting by Paolo Veronese

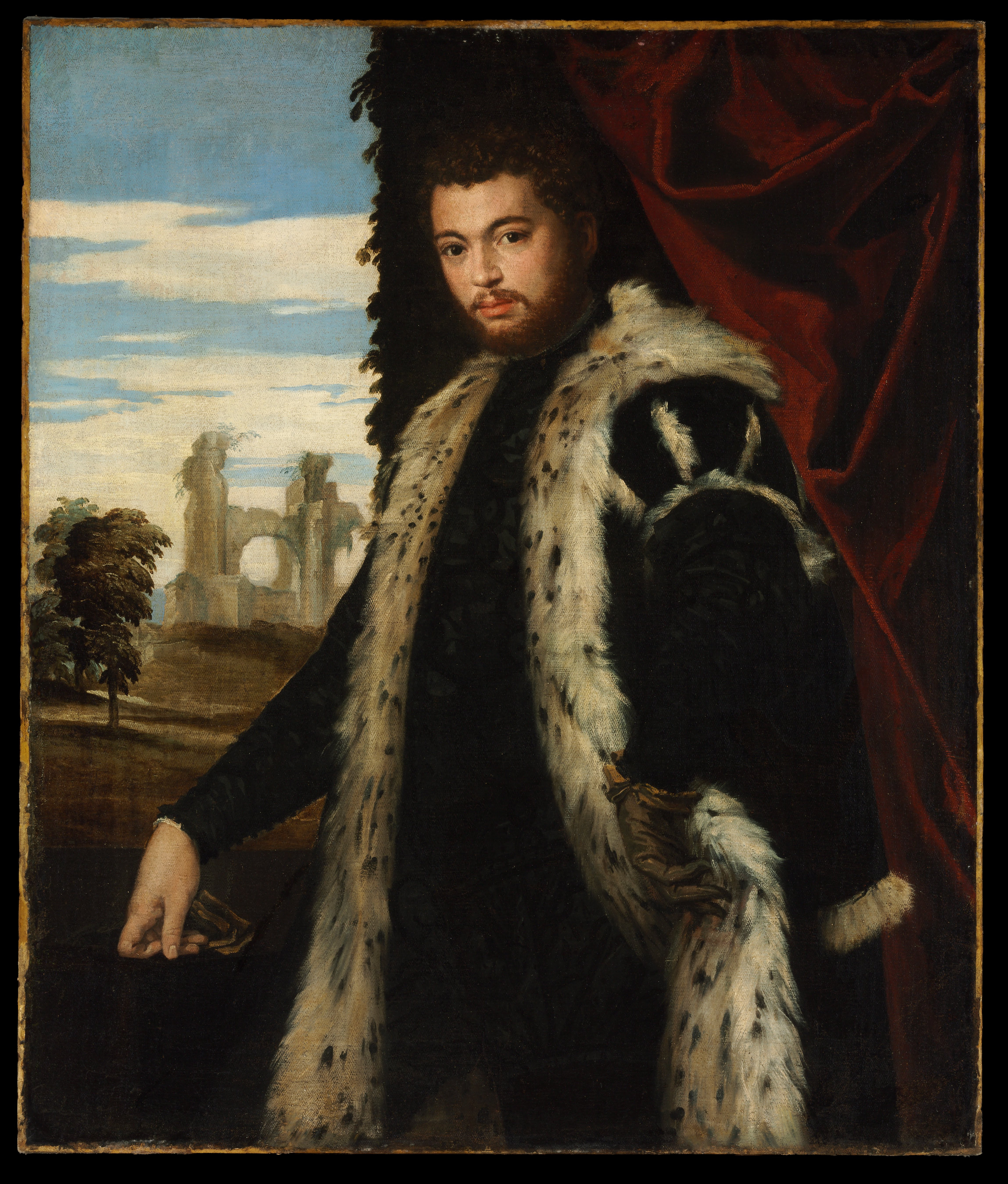
Portrait of a Young Man Wearing Lynx Fur (1560) by Paolo Veronese

Portrait of a Young Man Wearing Lynx Fur, Gentleman with a Lynx Pelt or Portrait of a Man is a 1560 painting by Paolo Veronese, produced during his stay in Rome and showing similarities to his Baptism of Christ (Herzog Anton Ulrich Museum, Brunswick) and The Anointing of David (Kunsthistorisches Museum, Vienna). It is now in the Museum of Fine Arts, in Budapest.
