= Portrait of a Young Man (Lotto, Accademia) =

Painting by Lorenzo Lotto, c. 1530

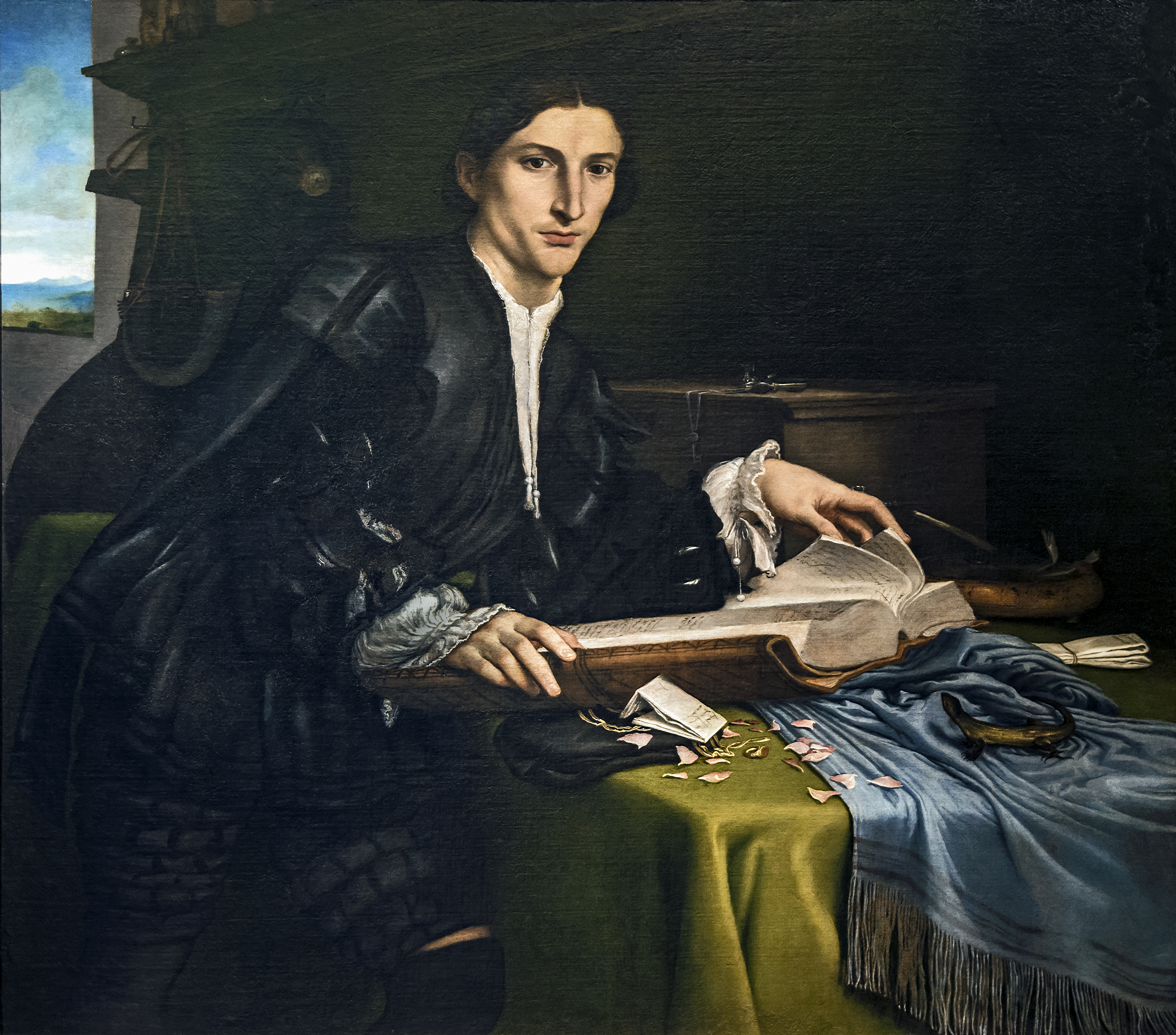
Portrait of a Young Man (c. 1530) by Lorenzo Lotto

Portrait of a Young Man or Portrait of a Gentleman in his Study is an oil-on-canvas painting by Lorenzo Lotto, created c. 1530, now in the Gallerie dell'Accademia of Venice. It is known in Italian as Giovane malato, literally The Ill Young Man – the flower with leaves is thought to be a symbol of disappointment in love or an illness, perhaps melancholy. The subject also turns his back on worldly pleasures (symbolised by a hunting horn, a dead bird and a lute). More so than in other works produced around the same time by the artist such as his Portrait of Andrea Odoni, it shows Lotto moving beyond the influence of Titian with more precise definition of details and contours.

The painting was purchased by the Gallerie dell'Accademia from a private collection in 1930.
