= Portrait of a Young Man with a Book =

Portrait of a Young Man with a Book may refer to these paintings:

- Portrait of a Young Man with a Book (Lotto), by Lorenzo Lotto, c. 1526
- Portrait of a Young Man with a Book (Bronzino), by Bronzino, c. 1530–1540
