= Jan Kupecký self portrait (Slovak National Gallery) =

Painting by Ján Kupecký

Portrait of a Man (Selfportrait)
- Portrét muža (Autoportrét) (Slovak)
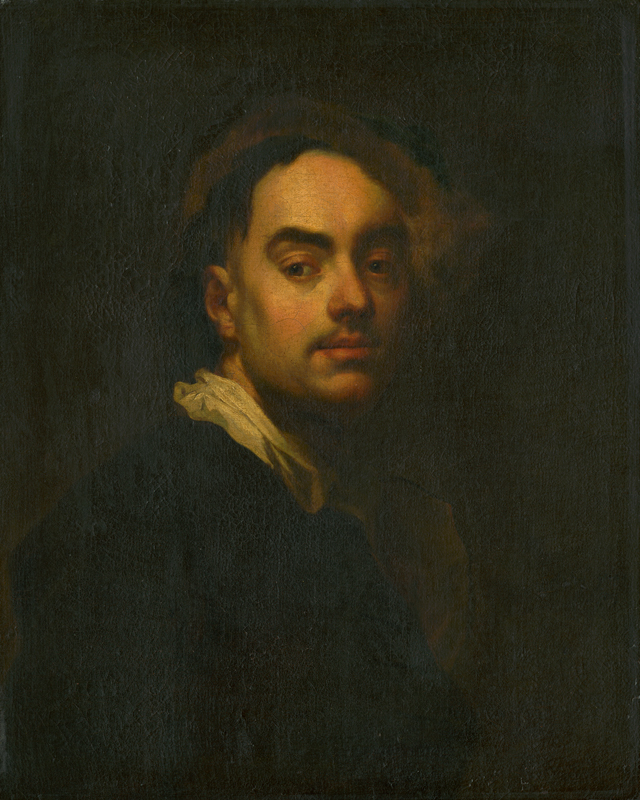
- Year: 1700–1709
- Medium: oil on canvas
- Dimensions: 68.2 cm × 56.0 cm (26.9 in × 22.0 in)
- Location: Slovak National Gallery; Bratislava

Portrait of a Man (Slovak: Portrét muža) or Self-portrait (Slovak: Autoportrét) is believed to be a self-portrait of Slovak painter Jan Kupecký created between 1700 and 1709. The picture is painted in oil on canvas with dimensions of 68.2 x 56 cm and is part of the collection of the Slovak National Gallery in Bratislava, Slovakia.

Kupiecký was one of the leading representatives of the Central European Baroque period and particularly known for his portraits. This work is unusual in that it highlights the facial features of the subject against an otherwise dark featureless background. Based on comparisons with his other subsequent works it was later signed and dated, somewhat indistinctly, as being by Kupecký in 1709 and considered for many years to be the only genuine work by Kupecký in the Slovak collection. It would have been created during the artist's time in Italy and the only known example of his work from that time.

However in a monograph by Eduard A. Safarik, a noted Italian art historian of Czech descent, it is suggested that the painting is actually a self-portrait by the younger artist Franz Anton Palko.
