= Portrait of a Young Man (Lotto, Gemäldegalerie) =

c. 1526 painting by Lorenzo Lotto

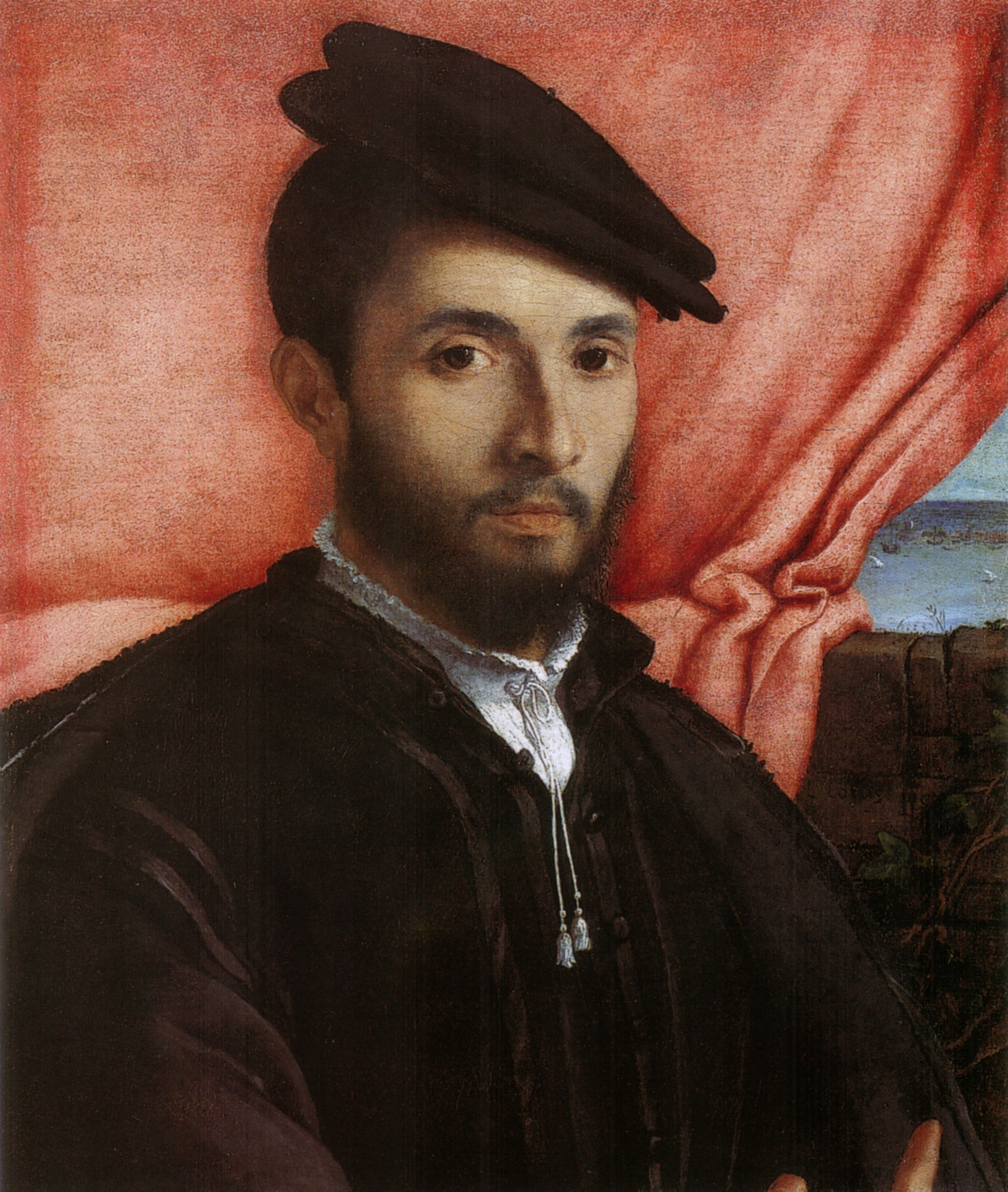
Portrait of a Young Man (c. 1526) by Lorenzo Lotto

Portrait of a Young Man is an oil-on-canvas painting by Lorenzo Lotto, signed "L. Lotus pict.". It was created c. 1526. Its dating is based on stylistic similarities to other works produced soon after the artist's return to Venice from Bergamo. It is now in the Gemäldegalerie, Berlin.

It appears in a 1638 inventory of marquess Vincenzo Giustiniani's collection. In 1815 it was sold via the Paris art dealer Féréol Bonnemaison to Frederick William III of Prussia. Old inventories record that the foreground originally had a marble balustrade, removed at an unknown date, leaving two fingertips. Those fingertips were painted black to merge in with the man's costume, but were uncovered in a later restoration. The fictive curtain in the background parts to show a maritime scene, perhaps the Venetian lagoon.
