= Portrait of a Man (Titian, Indianapolis) =

Painting by Titian

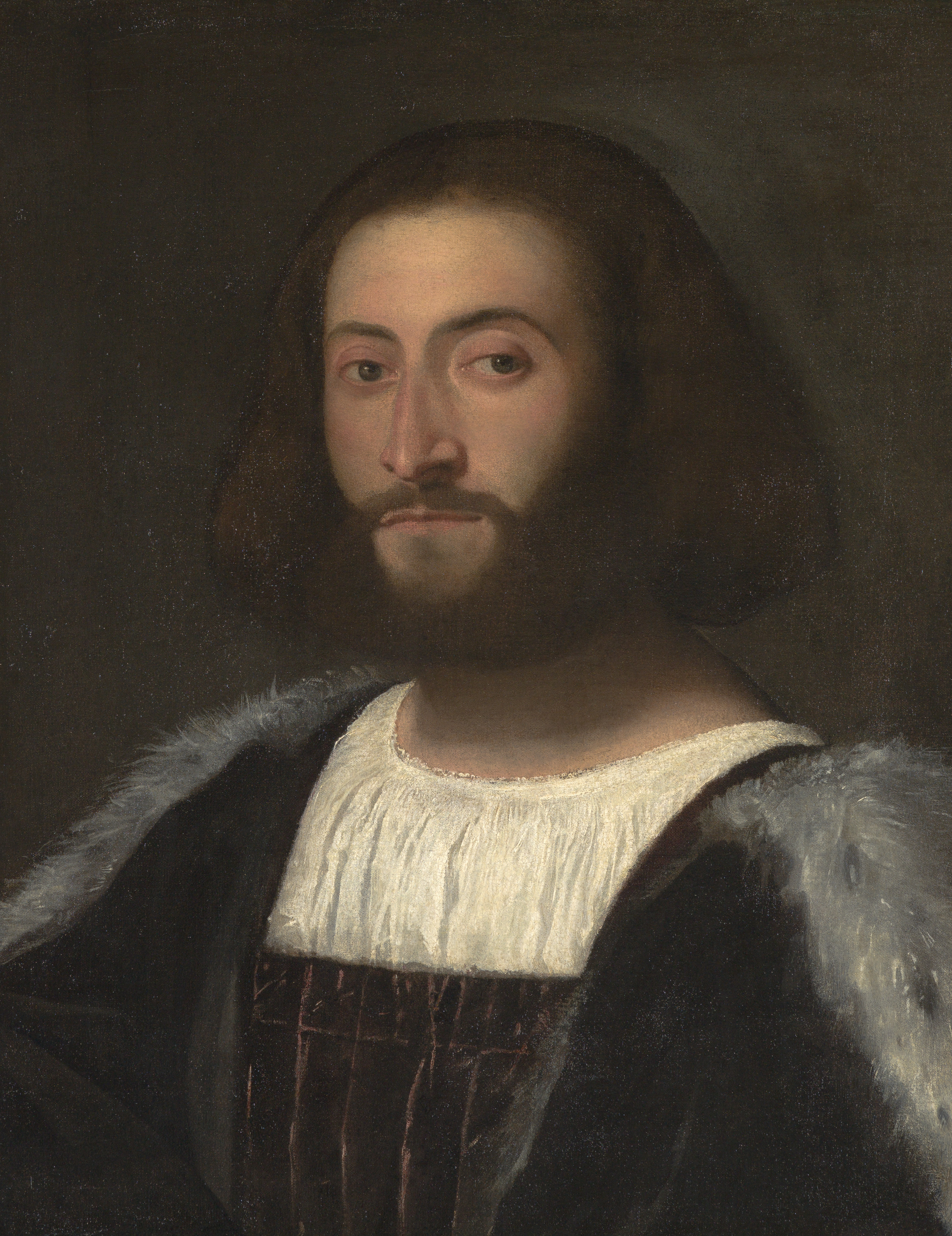
Portrait of a Man, c. 1515 (59.5 x 45.5 cm; 23.4 x 17.9 in)

Portrait of a Man is an oil painting by Titian, made about 1515, now in the Indianapolis Museum of Art.

== Identity of the sitter ==
It may have been the painting seen by Carlo Ridolfi in Nicolas Régnier's house around 1648. It has traditionally been known as Portrait of Ariosto due to its similarity to A Man with a Quilted Sleeve, another Titian work previously thought to depict Ariosto, and to a print of Ariosto in the 1532 edition of Orlando Furioso.

== Provenance ==
Its status as an autograph work by the artist is supported by Bernard Berenson. Auctioned at Sotheby's in London on 29 January 1930, it passed to the Booth Tarkington collection in Indianapolis.

== See also ==
- List of works by Titian
