= Portrait of a Gentleman (Lotto) =

c. 1535 painting by Lorenzo Lotto

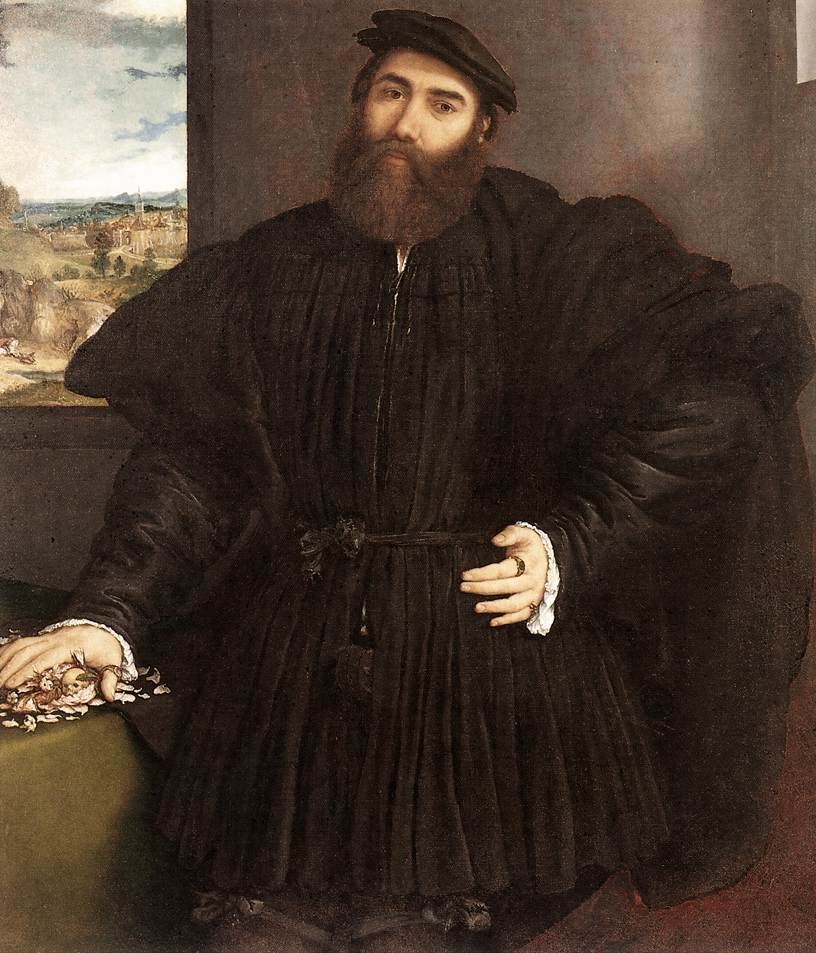
Portrait of a Gentleman (c. 1535) by Lorenzo Lotto

Portrait of a Gentleman is an oil-on-canvas painting by the Italian artist Lorenzo Lotto, created c. 1535, now in the Galleria Borghese in Rome. It first appears in the written record in 1790, when it is mentioned in an inventory of the Galleria Borghese.

Its dating is based on stylistic similarities to other works by Lotto of the mid 1530s. One theory as to the subject holds him to be the Albanian condottiero Mercurio Bua, who died in the service of Venice around 1542, which would re-date the work to the 1520s. The scene seen through the window in the left background includes Saint George and the dragon, a popular subject with the Balkan community in Venice.

The work was once identified as a self-portrait of the artist, but the symbols shown in the painting argue against this – these include flower petals and a miniature skull on the table. The subject holds his hand on his spleen, then thought to be the seat of melancholy or mourning. This, the two rings on his forefinger and his black costume would fit with the identification with Bua, who was a widower in 1524.
