= Portrait of a Young Man (Bellini, Liverpool) =

Oil painting by Giovanni Bellini

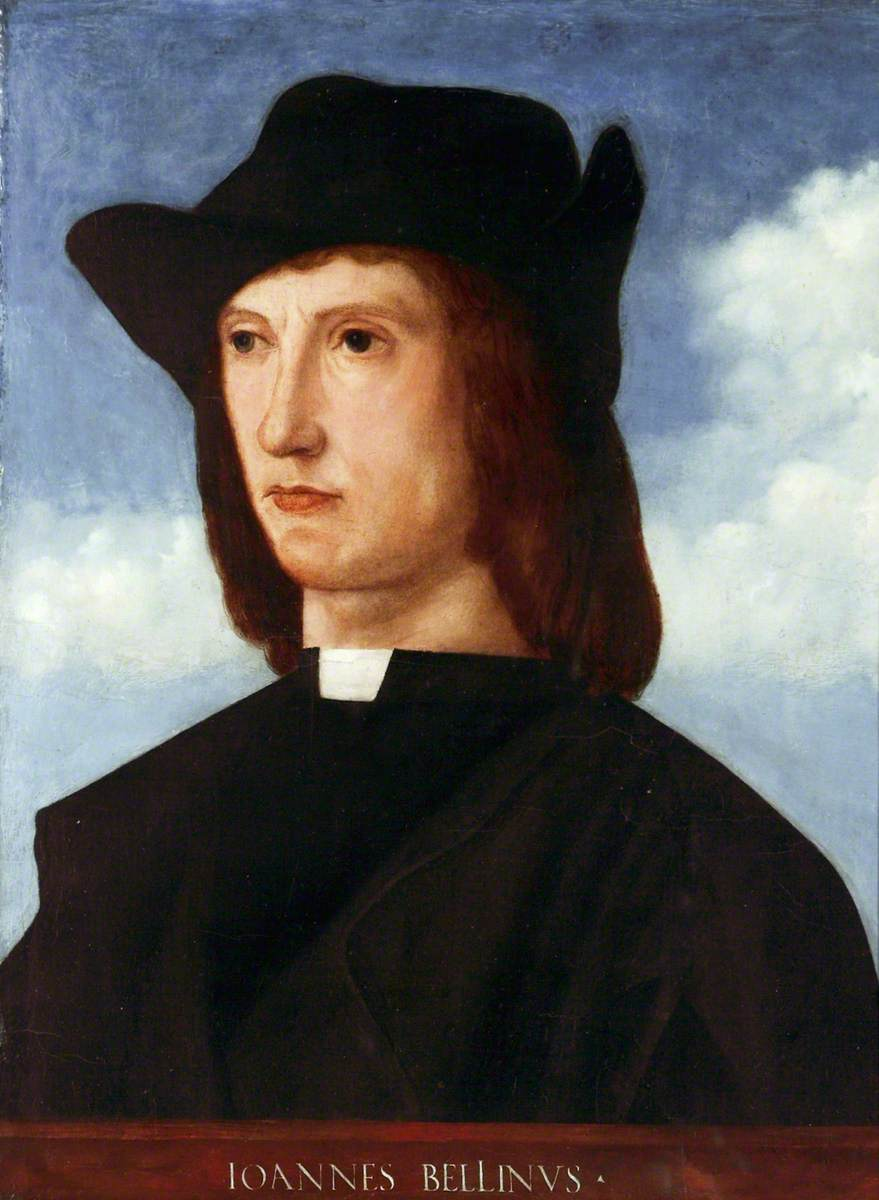
- Artist: Giovanni Bellini
- Year: possibly c. 1500–1516
- Medium: oil on panel
- Dimensions: 35.1 cm × 27 cm (13.8 in × 11 in)
- Location: Walker Art Gallery, Liverpool
- Website: Art UK entry

Portrait of a Young Man is an oil painting on panel by Giovanni Bellini in the Walker Art Gallery in Liverpool, to which it was donated in 1948 by the Liverpool Royal Institution.

== See also ==
- List of works by Giovanni Bellini
