= Portrait of a Young Man (Bellini, Royal Collection) =

Painting by Giovanni Bellini

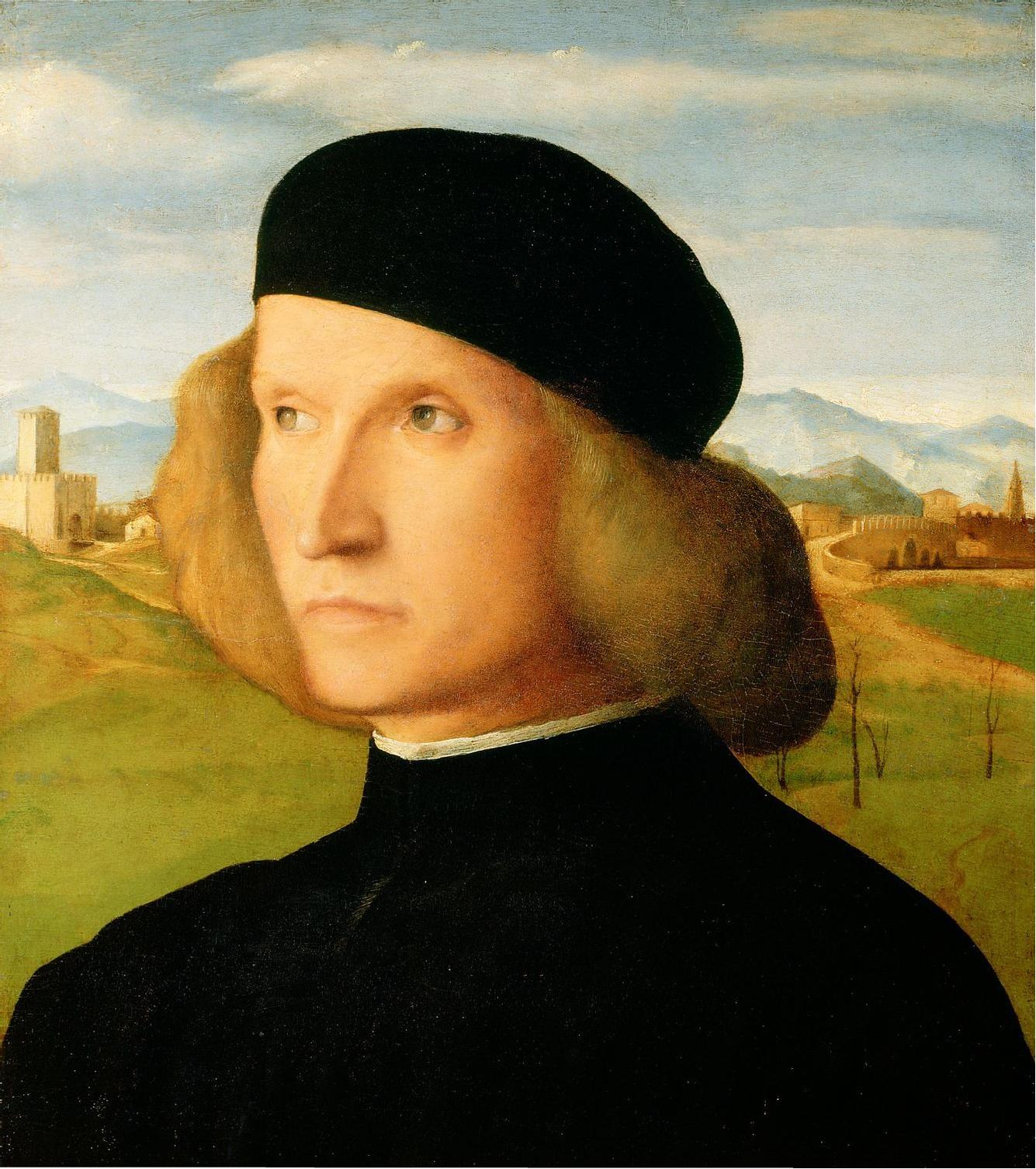
- Artist: Giovanni Bellini
- Year: c.1505
- Medium: oil on panel
- Location: Royal Collection
- Website: Catalogue entry

Portrait of a Young Man is a c.1505 oil-on-panel painting by the Italian painter Giovanni Bellini. It is the latest surviving portrait by the artist, drawing on the work of Antonello da Messina and Dutch painters of the time. It is also the only portrait in which he included a landscape behind the sitter. He signed it on a cartouche on the trompe-l'œil marble parapet in the foreground.

The work was bought by Consul Smith and then passed into the British Royal Collection in 1762 when George III of the United Kingdom bought Smith's collection. In 2018 it hung in the King's Closet of Windsor Castle.

The sitter's robe is that of a 'cittadino', the rank in Venetian society between that of patrician. His identity is unknown, although a theory arose in the 1940s that he was the humanist Pietro Bembo; Vasari records Bellini painting a lost portrait of Bembo's mistress, whilst Bellini's biographer Carlo Ridolfi mentions a portrait of Bembo in a list of his works, although this is the only documentary mention of any such work. Bembo would be thirty-five at the time the painting was produced but, although the sitter's nose does seem to match with later medals showing Bembo, his eyes and eyebrows seem to be different.

== See also ==
- List of works by Giovanni Bellini
