= Madonna and Child (disambiguation) =

Madonna and Child is another name for Madonna (art). Works with this title include:

== Giovanni Bellini ==
- Madonna and Child (Bellini, Detroit)
- Madonna and Child (Bellini, New York, 1485–1490)
- Madonna and Child (Bellini, Milan, 1460–1465)
- Madonna and Child (Bellini, Milan, 1510)
- Madonna and Child (Bellini, Pavia)
- Madonna and Child (Bellini, Rome)
- Madonna and Child (Bellini, Venice, 1475)
- Madonna and Child (Bellini, Verona)

== Sandro Botticelli ==
- Madonna and Child (Botticelli, Avignon)
- Madonna and Child (Botticelli, Museo Stibbert)

== Cima da Conegliano ==
- Madonna and Child (Cima, Amsterdam)
- Madonna and Child (Cima, Bologna)
- Madonna and Child (Cima, Cardiff)
- Madonna and Child (Cima, Detroit)
- Madonna and Child (Cima, Este)
- Madonna and Child (Cima, Florence)
- Madonna and Child (Cima, Gemona del Friuli)
- Madonna and Child (Cima, Minneapolis)
- Madonna and Child (Cima, Paris)
- Madonna and Child (workshop of Cima, Paris)
- Madonna and Child (Cima, private collection)
- Madonna and Child (Cima, Saint Petersburg)
- Madonna and Child (Cima, San Francisco)

== Filippo Lippi ==
- Madonna and Child (Lippi), Florence
- Madonna and Child (Filippo Lippi, Parma)

== Other artists ==
- Madonna and Child (Jacopo Bellini)
- Madonna and Child (Correggio, Vienna)
- Madonna and Child (Donatello, Louvre)
- Madonna and Child (Duccio)
- Madonna and Child (van Dyck)
- Madonna and Child (Gentile da Fabriano)
- Madonna and Child (Artemisia Gentileschi)
- Madonna and Child (Mantegna, Bergamo)
- Madonna and Child (Perugino)
- Madonna and Child (Raphael)
- Madonna and Child (Schiavone)
- Madonna and Child (Francesco Solimena)
- Madonna and Child (Umlauf)

== See also ==
- Madonna and Child with Saints (disambiguation)
- Madonna and Child with the Infant John the Baptist (disambiguation)
- Virgin and Child (disambiguation)
