= Virgin and Child with Two Angels =

Virgin and Child with Two Angels may refer to one of these paintings:

- Virgin and Child with Two Angels (c. 1468–1469), by Sandro Botticelli, in Naples
- Virgin and Child with Two Angels (1468 or 1469), by Sandro Botticelli, in Strasbourg
- Virgin and Child with Two Angels (c. 1280), by Cimabue, in National Gallery, UK
- Virgin and Child with Two Angels (c. 1467–1469), by Andrea del Verrocchio, in National Gallery, UK
- Madonna and Child (c. 1450–1465), by Filippo Lippi, in Uffizi Gallery, Italy
- Madonna and Child Enthroned with Two Angels (c. 1410–1415), by Gentile da Fabriano
- Madonna and Child with Two Angels, Saint Rose and Saint Catherine (c. 1490–1492), by Pietro Perugino, in Uffizi Gallery, Italy
- Madonna and Child with Two Musician Angels (1515 or 1516), by Correggio, in the Louvre
