= Virgin and Child (disambiguation) =

Virgin and Child is a representation in art of Mary with her child Jesus.

Virgin and Child may also refer to:

- "The Virgin and Child" (song), a 15th-century English Christmas carol
- Virgin and Child (David), an oil painting of around 1520 by Gerard David
- Virgin and Child (Filocamo), an Italian wall painting by Antonio Filocamo
- Virgin and Child (after van der Goes?), a c. 1485–90 triptych
- Virgin and Child (Rubens), a painting by Rubens completed between 1608 and 1621
- Virgin and Child (Sirani), a 1663 oil painting by Elisabetta Sirani
- Virgin and Child (van der Weyden) a painting by Rogier van der Weyden in 15th century

== See also ==
- Madonna and Child (disambiguation)
- Virgin and Child with an Angel (disambiguation)
- Virgin and Child with Saint Anne (disambiguation)
- Virgin and Child with Two Angels (disambiguation)
