= Madonna and Child (Bellini, Rome) =

Painting by Giovanni Bellini in the Galleria Borghese, Rome

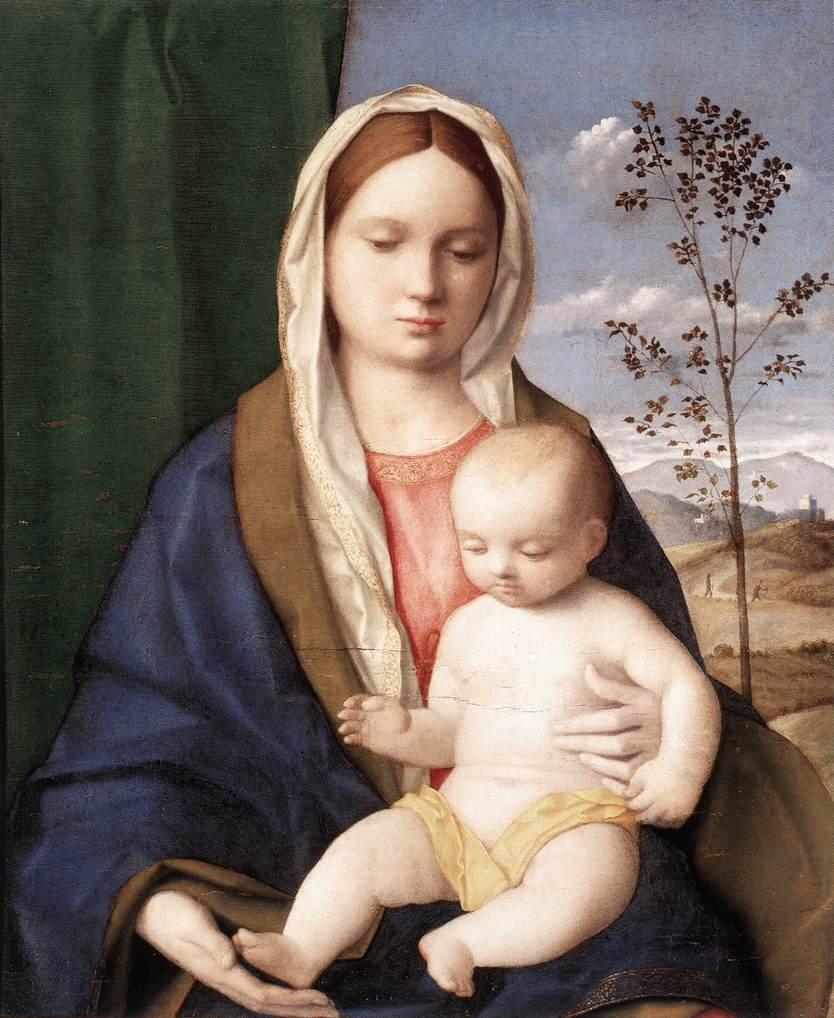
- Artist: Giovanni Bellini
- Year: c. 1500
- Medium: oil on panel
- Dimensions: 50 cm × 41 cm (20 in × 16 in)
- Location: Galleria Borghese, Rome

Madonna and Child is an oil painting on panel created c. 1510 by the Italian Renaissance master Giovanni Bellini, now in the Galleria Borghese in Rome. It can be compared with the 1510 Madonna and Child (Brera), the 1505 Madonna del Prato (London) and the 1509 Madonna and Child (Detroit).

== See also ==
- List of works by Giovanni Bellini
