= Madonna and Child (Botticelli, Museo Stibbert) =

Painting by Sandro Botticelli

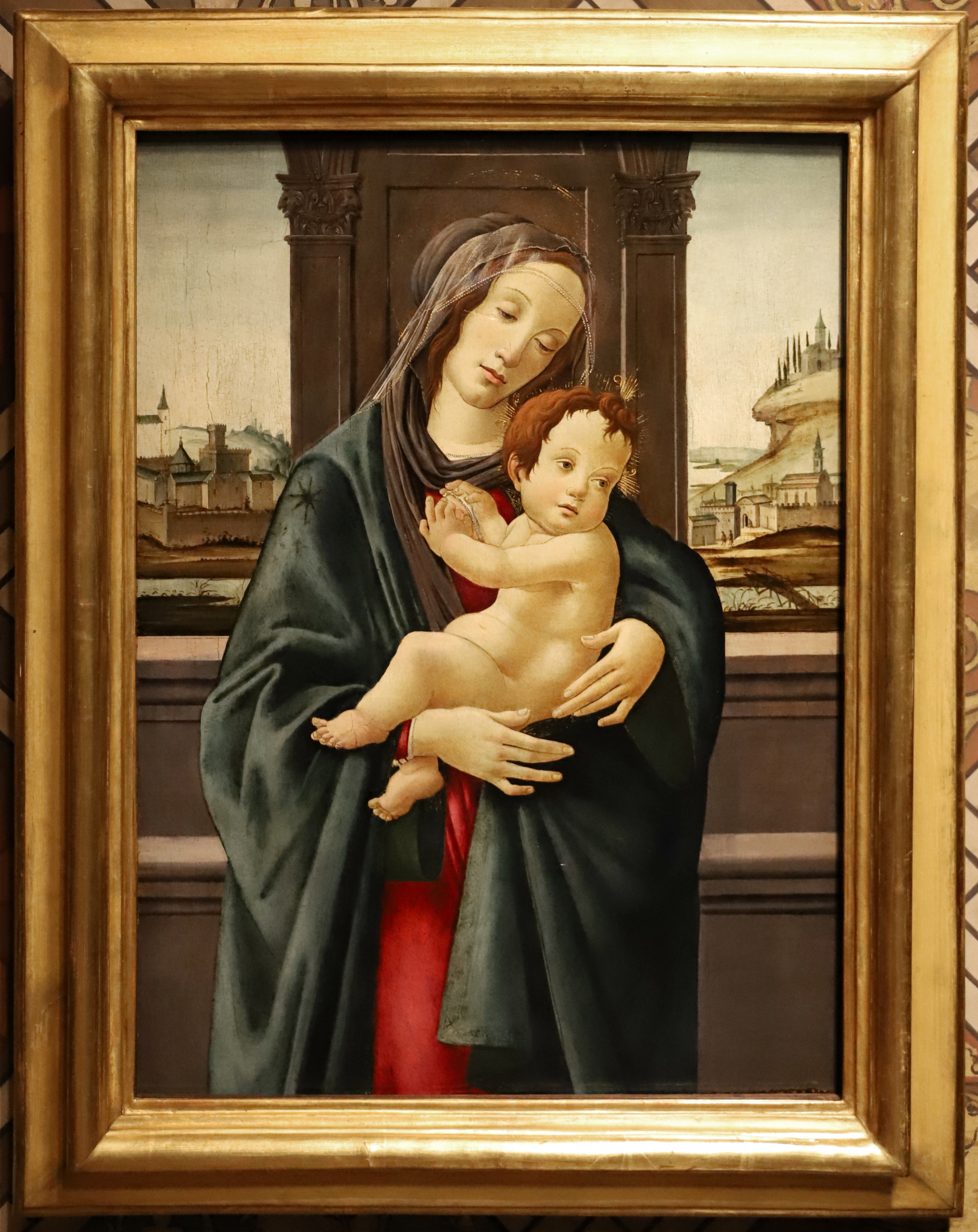
- Artist: Sandro Botticelli
- Year: c. 1490
- Medium: Tempera on wood panel
- Dimensions: 73.5 cm × 57.5 cm
- Location: Museo Stibbert, Florence

Madonna and Child is a painting by Sandro Botticelli, dated to around 1490, in the Museo Stibbert in Florence. The work is painted in tempera on wood panel and measures 73.5 cm by 57.5 cm.

== Description ==
The painting depicts the Virgin Mary holding the Christ Child in a devotional composition. The figures are shown against an architectural and landscape background. The composition and delicate handling of faces and drapery reflect Botticelli's late style, characterised by lyrical figures and a poetic sensibility.

== Dating and style ==
The work is generally dated to the late 15th century (c. 1490–1500) and belongs to Botticelli's later devotional production. The dating places the picture among Botticelli's later devotional works produced after the death of Lorenzo de' Medici (1492) and shows the impact of Girolamo Savonarola's preaching, while retaining his extraordinary pictorial talent and a more intense poetic rendering.

== History ==
The original context and early ownership of the painting are unknown; published references begin after the panel entered the collection of the Anglo-Italian collector Frederick Stibbert in Florence in the early 1870s, when he purchased a Madonna col Bambino traditionally attributed to Sandro Botticelli. During Stibbert's lifetime the painting underwent heavy nineteenth-century restorations that substantially altered its original appearance.

When the collector's villa and art collections were opened to the public as the Museo Stibbert in 1908, the work was considered a damaged workshop production and was placed in storage, where it remained largely ignored by scholars for many decades. A first conservation campaign at the restoration laboratories of the Uffizi removed much of the nineteenth-century overpainting, but the panel did not yet recover its original character.

Renewed interest in the painting arose only in the twenty-first century, when a request to borrow it for an exhibition in Japan led to a full programme of technical analysis and restoration carried out by conservator Lucia Biondi; after this work the painting returned to display in the Stibbert galleries and began to be discussed as a "forgotten Botticelli".

In 2022–23 the Madonna and Child was one of four Tuscan works shown in the Christmas exhibition La Carità e la Bellezza at Palazzo Marino in Milan, which presented it as a painting executed around 1500. The work has since been included in further loan exhibitions devoted to Botticelli's devotional imagery.
