= Madonna del Prato =

Madonna del Prato may refer to:

- Madonna del Prato (Bellini)
- Madonna del Prato (Raphael)
