= Madonna and Child (Cima, Florence) =

Painting by Cima da Conegliano

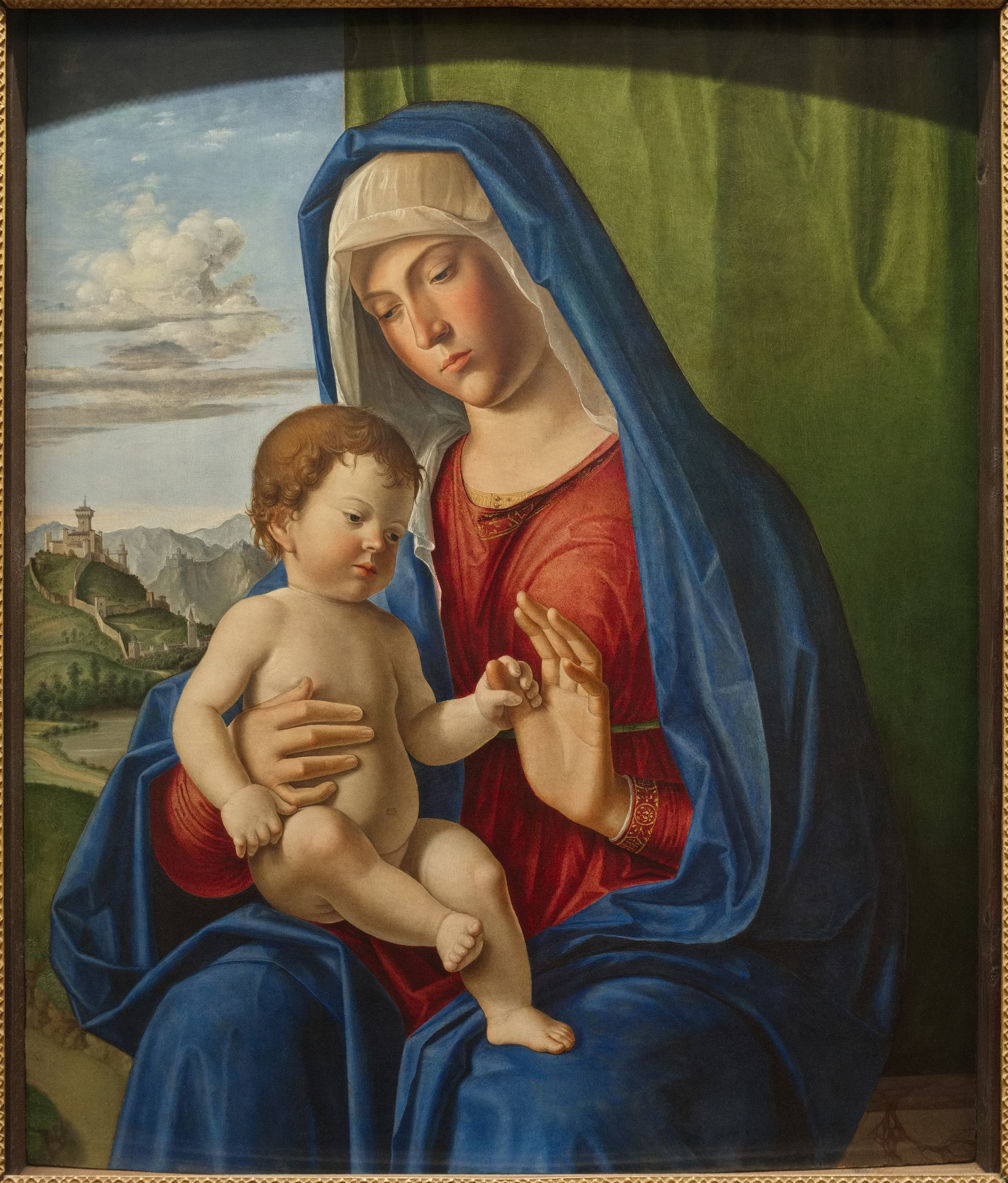
Madonna and Child (c. 1504) by Cima da Conegliano

Madonna and Child is an oil on panel painting by Cima da Conegliano, created c. 1504, that now hangs in the Uffizi in Florence. It has an early copy attributed to Antonio Maria da Carpi, now in the Musei civici di Padova.

Its attribution has been criticised in the past, though Bernard Berenson takes an intermediate position in stating it is a youthful work by the artist and Heinemann argues that the figures but not the landscape are autograph. Restorations in 1984 and 2010 have led to its definitive attribution to Cima de Conegliano. Its dating is based on its similarity to another Madonna by the artist in the Museo Nazionale Atestino, though the latter shows the Christ Child squeezing his mother's left thumb.
