= Giles Stibbert =

- Born: 1734
- Died: January 1809
- Burial place: St. Mary's Church, South Stoneham, Hampshire, England
- Military career
- Allegiance: Kingdom of Great Britain
- Branch: British Army
- Rank: Lieutenant General
- Commands: Indian Army
- Conflicts: Battle of Plassey; Battle of Buxar

Lieutenant General Giles Stibbert (1734–1809) was Commander-in-Chief, India.

== Military career ==
Stibber arrived in India in 1756 and took part in the Battle of Plassey in 1757. He then raised a battalion of native infantry at Bankipore in 1761 and commanded them at the Siege of Patna where he was wounded in 1763. He commanded the left wing of the Army at the Battle of Buxar in 1764 and captured Chunar in 1765.

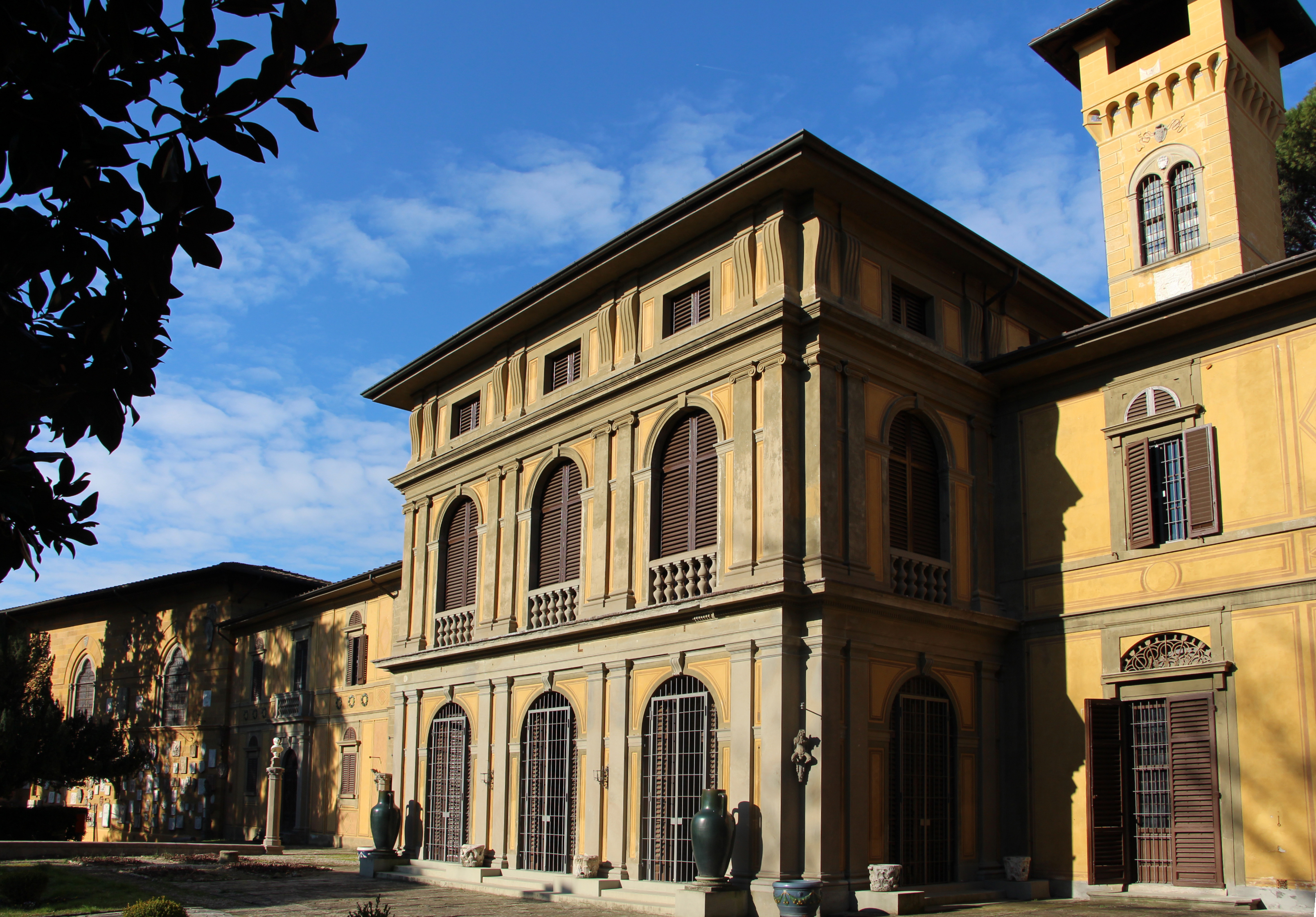
Stibbert Museum, Florence

He was twice Commander-in-Chief, India, firstly from 1777 to 1779 and then again from 1783, following the death of Sir Eyre Coote, to 1785. He made a huge wealth during his service in India, when in England he resided at Hereford Street with his 3 children and wife. Stibbert then commissioned John Crunden the architect of Hereford Street to build his country estate the first Portswood House at Portswood in Hampshire in 1778.

His grandson, Frederick Stibbert, used the family's wealth to establish the Stibbert museum in Florence. He made the family home on the Hill of Montughi, which was originally purchased by his mother, into a museum to hold his collection.

He is buried in South Stoneham in Hampshire with a monument by John Bacon.

== Family ==
He was married to Sophronia Rebecca Wright.

Military offices
Preceded by Sir John Clavering	Commander-in-Chief, India; 1777–1779	Succeeded by Sir Eyre Coote
Preceded by Sir Eyre Coote	Commander-in-Chief, India; 1783–1785	Succeeded by Sir Robert Sloper
