= Lucrezia Buti =

Italian nun

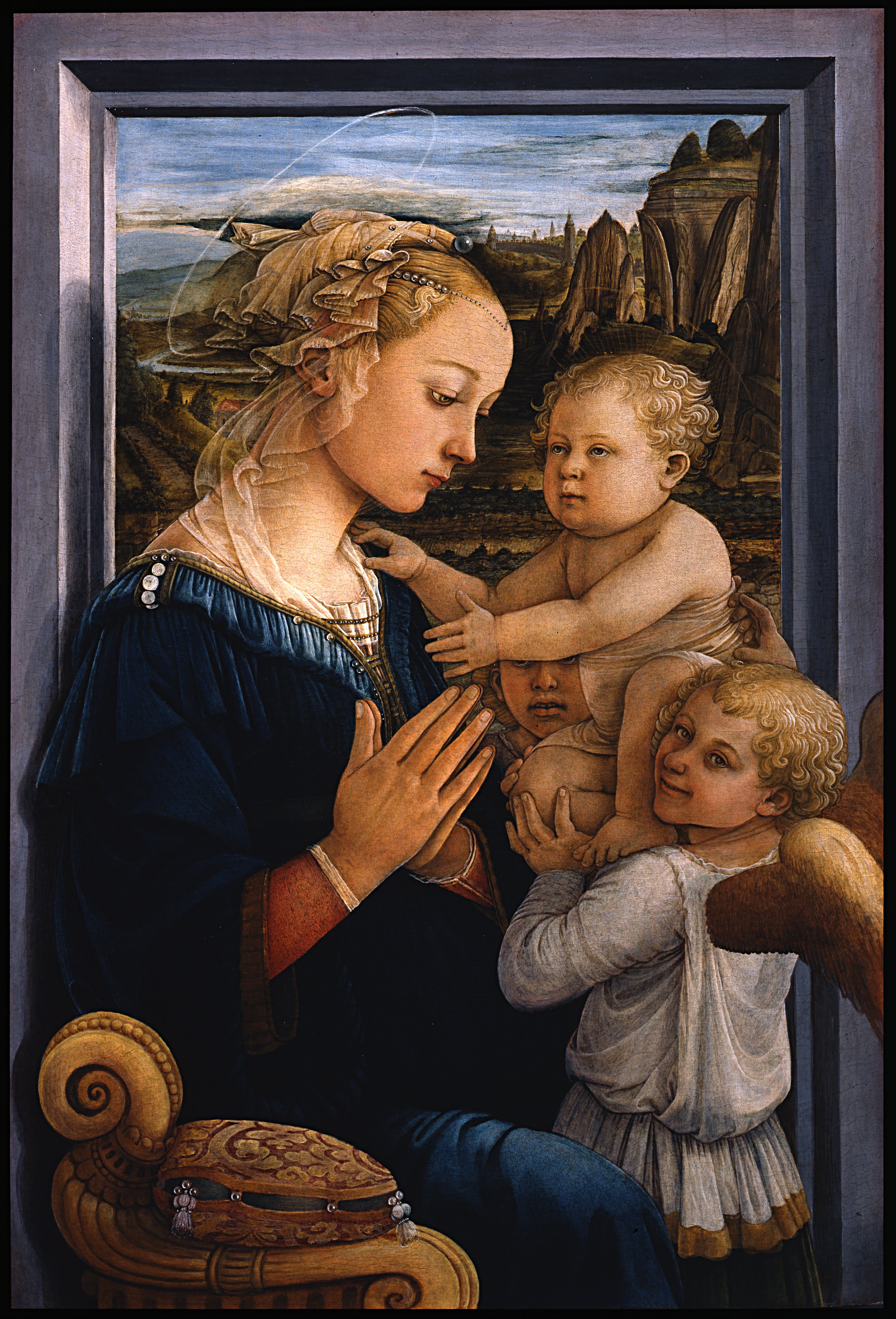
Madonna and Child, Filippo Lippi, (c.1456-1465), Uffizi Gallery, Florence, believed to be a portrait of Lucrezia Buti

Lucrezia Buti (born 1435) was an Italian nun who later became the lover of the painter Fra Filippo Lippi and the mother of his children. She is believed to be the model for several Madonnas portrayed in Lippi's paintings.

== Life ==
Lucrezia was born in Florence in 1435, the daughter of Caterina Ciacchi and Francesco Buti. She entered the Dominican monastery of Santa Margherita in Prato. According to the art historian Giorgio Vasari (1511–1574), while a novice or boarder there, she met the painter Fra Filippo Lippi who in 1456 had been commissioned to create a painting for its high altar. Lippi requested Buti as a model for the Virgin in the painting.

Lippi fell in love with Buti during her sittings and caused a great scandal by kidnapping her from a procession of the Girdle of Thomas in the city and taking her to his nearby home in the piazza del Duomo. Despite attempts to force her to return to the monastery, Buti remained at Lippi's house.

In 1457, Buti bore their son, Filippino, and in 1465 their daughter, Alessandra. Through the intervention of Cosimo de' Medici, the couple received a dispensation to marry from Pius II. In his biography of Fra Filippo Lippi that was written in the next century, Vasari states that they never married.

Their son became a talented artist and was among the students of Fra Filippo Lippi along with Sandro Botticelli and Francesco di Pesello (called Pesellino), who were among his most distinguished pupils.

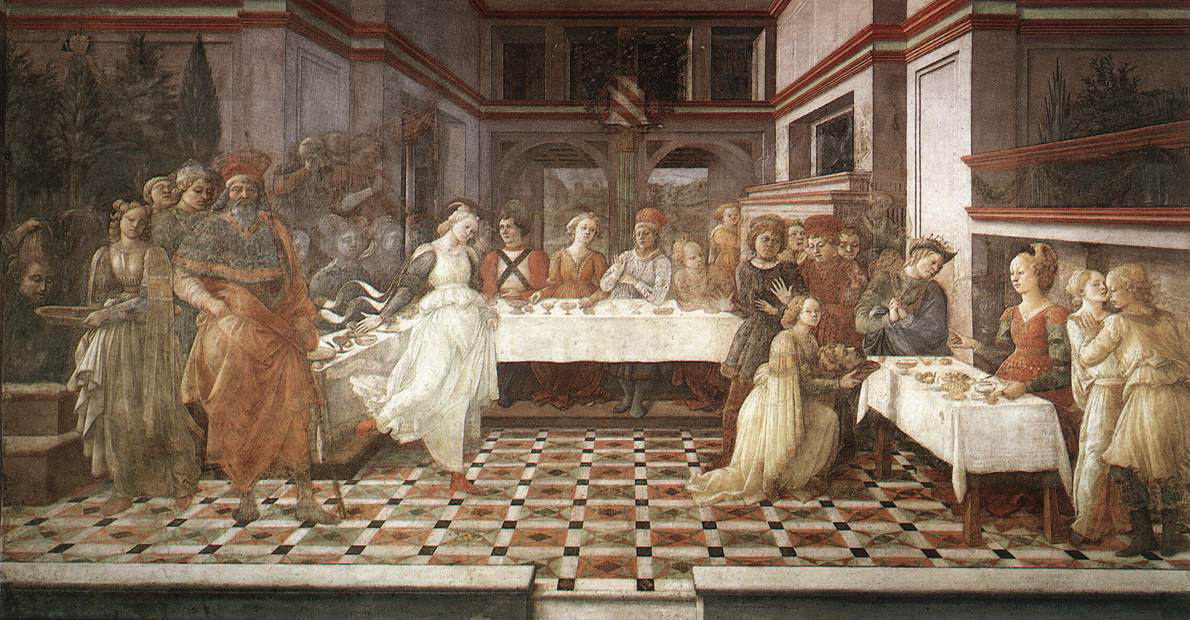
Salome dancing at the Feast of Herod, fresco series, Stories of St. Stephen and St. John the Baptist, (c. 1456–1465)

Lucrezia is thought to be the model for Lippi's Madonna and Child, and for Salome in his fresco series of the Stories of St. Stephen and St. John the Baptist in the cathedral of Prato.

== See also ==
- Catholic Church in Italy

== Sources ==
- Vasari, Giorgio, Lives of the Artists
