= Virgin and Child with Two Angels (Verrocchio) =

Painting by Andrea del Verrocchio

Madonna of the Milk
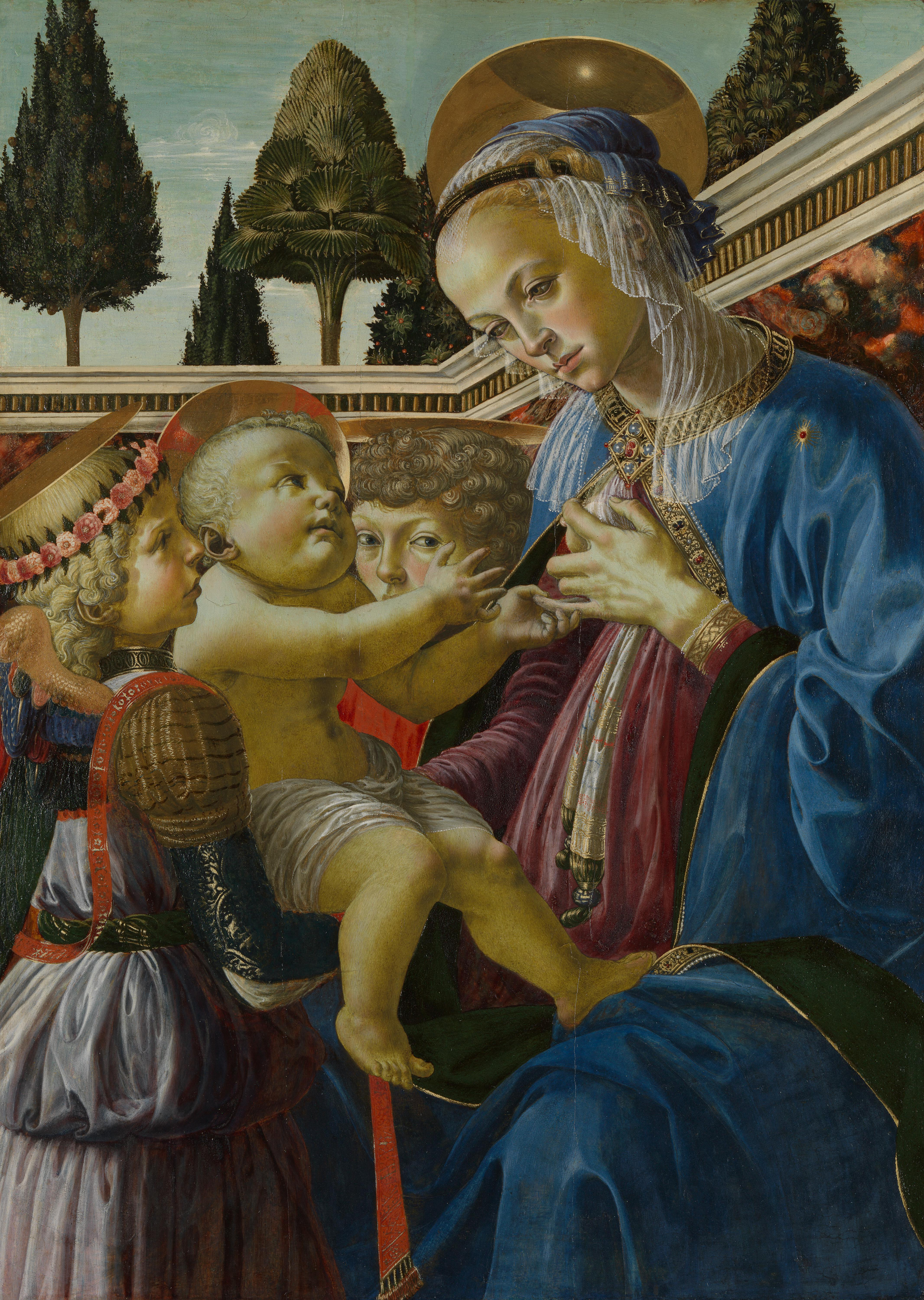
- Artist: Andrea del Verrocchio
- Year: 1467–1469
- Medium: Tempera on panel
- Dimensions: 69.2 cm × 49.8 cm (27.2 in × 19.6 in)
- Location: National Gallery, London

The Virgin and Child with Two Angels (Italian, sometimes: Madonna del Latte) is a painting by the Italian Renaissance painter Andrea del Verrocchio, dating from circa 1467–1469. It is in the National Gallery, London, United Kingdom.

== Description ==
The theme derives from Filippo Lippi's works such as the Lippina (c. 1465), with Mary holding the child Jesus on her womb, with the help of two baby angels. The scene is set in a marble enclosure, a reference to the hortus conclusus. Behind it, in the background, is a stylized landscape.

Sandro Botticelli was in turn inspired by this painting (which a restoration has confirmed to be from Verrocchio), for his Madonna and Child and Two Angels now on display in the Capodimonte Museum of Naples.
