= Christ Child Blessing =

Painting by Andrea Mantegna

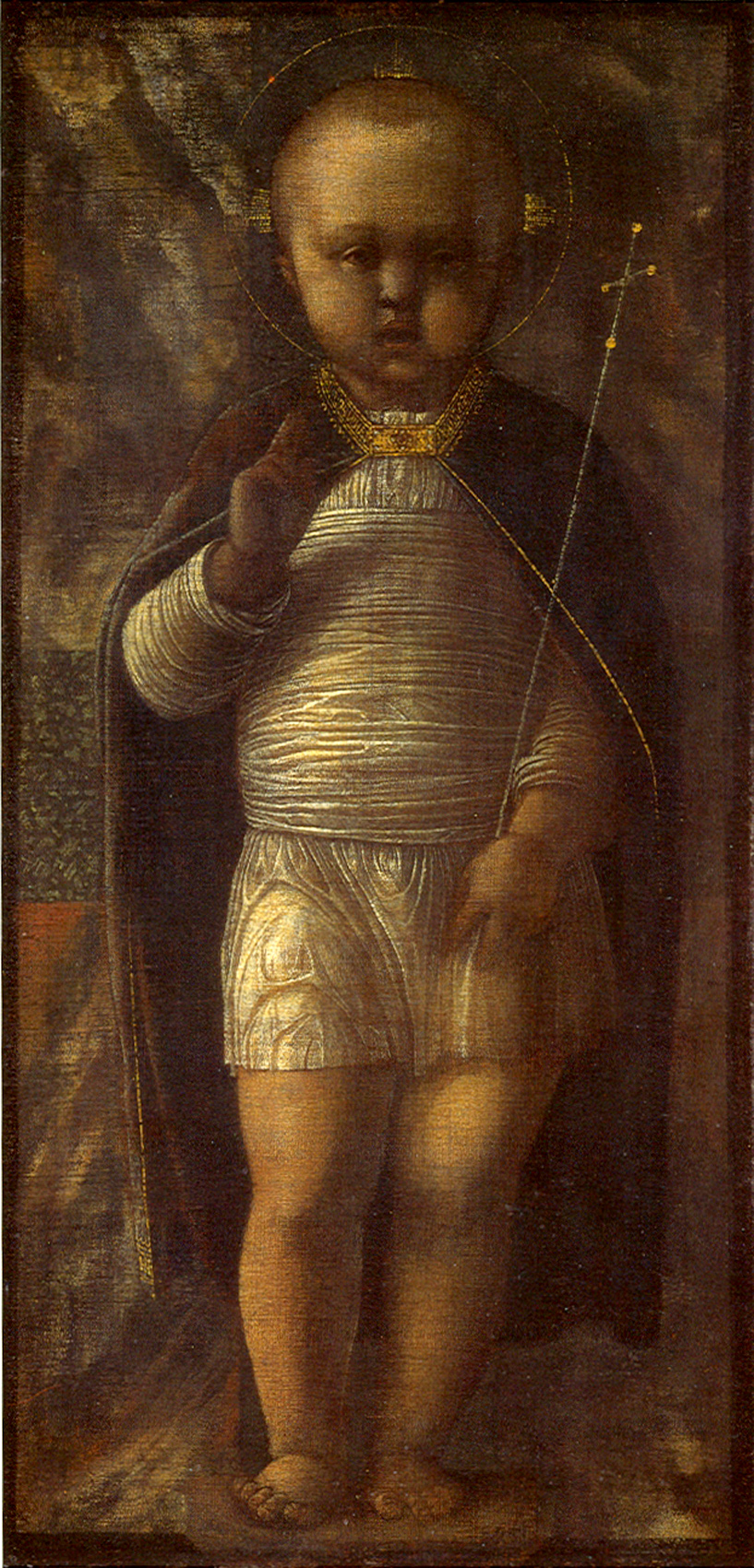

Christ Child Blessing is a 1455–1460 tempera painting on panel by Andrea Mantegna. It is now in the National Gallery of Art.

It is attributed to his young period in Padua. It is first recorded in 1901, when it was in the collection of Sir Francis Cook at Richmond, Surrey. It passed to his descendants before being auctioned in London in 1947, when it was bought by Alessandro Contini-Bonacossi. Contini-Bonacossi sold it to the Samuel H. Kress Foundation in 1948. It was given to its present owner in 1952.

The painting may have originally been intended to be displayed above a doorway.

== See also ==
- Madonna and Child (Bellini, Detroit) (1509)
- Madonna and Child (Bellini, Milan, 1510)
