= Antonio Maria da Carpi =

Italian artist, active 1495

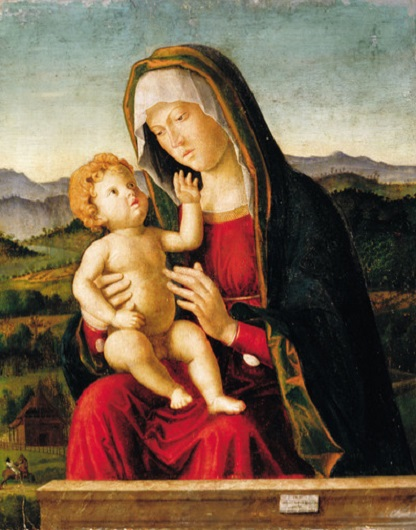
Madonna and Child by Antonio Maria da Carpi (Budapest)

Antonio Maria da Carpi (active 1495 – c.1504) was an Italian Renaissance painter.

== Life ==
Born in Carpi, Emilia-Romagna, little is known of his life. He was most probably a pupil of Cima da Conegliano, the only two surviving works definitively attributed to him are Madonna and Child (35.8 × 28.4 cm; Museum of Fine Arts, Budapest) and Madonna and Child (89 x 65 cm; private collection), both oil on panel and both dated to 1497.

== Previous attributions ==
Though previously attributed to him, most of these works are now assigned to Cima de Conegliano or his workshop.

- Madonna and Child, panel, 68.9 × 54.5 cm., Walters Art Museum, Baltimore, 1490-1510
- Madonna and Child, originally panel, later transferred to canvas, 62 × 49 cm., Accademia Carrara, Bergamo, 1490-1510
- Annunciation, panel, 40 × 32 cm., Gemäldegalerie, Berlin, 1490-1510
- Madonna and Child, panel, 31.5 × 25 cm., Musée d'Art et d'Histoire, Geneva, 1505-1510
- Madonna and Child, panel, 80.5 × 66 cm., private collection, 1485-1517
- Madonna and Child, panel, 57 × 42 cm., Musei civici agli Eremitani, Padua, 1490-1510
- Visitation, panel, 145 × 100 cm, Cattedrale di S. Maria Assunta, Parma, 1490-1510
