= Madonna and Child (Francesco Solimena) =

1720 painting by Francesco Solimena

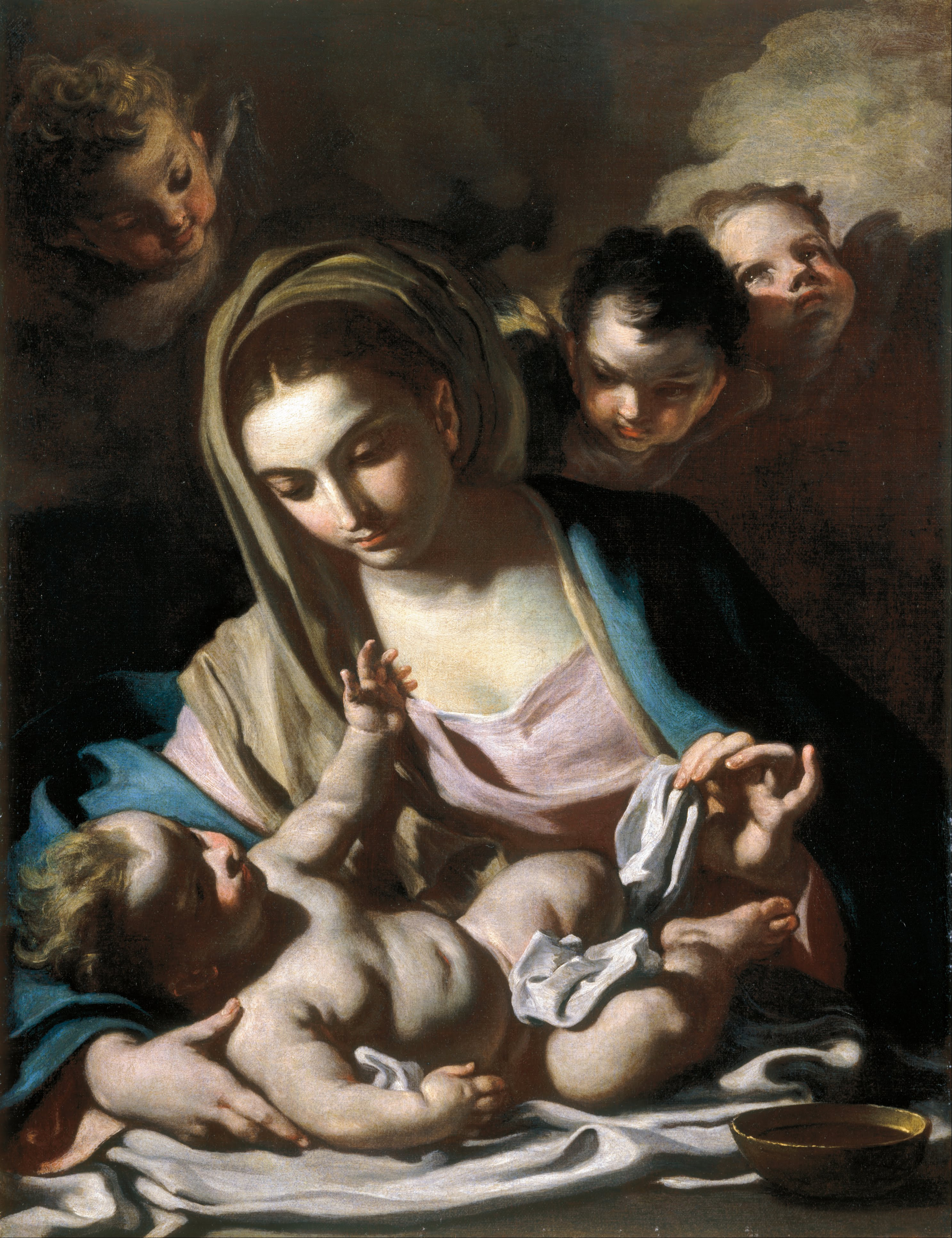
- Artist: Francesco Solimena
- Year: 1720
- Medium: Oil on canvas
- Dimensions: 64.50 cm × 48 cm (25.39 in × 19 in)

Madonna and Child is a 1720 oil on canvas painting by Francesco Solimena, a prolific Italian painter of the Baroque era, one of an established family of painters and draughtsmen. It is now in the Art Gallery of South Australia.
