= Madonna and Child (Bellini, Milan, 1510) =

1510 painting by Giovanni Bellini

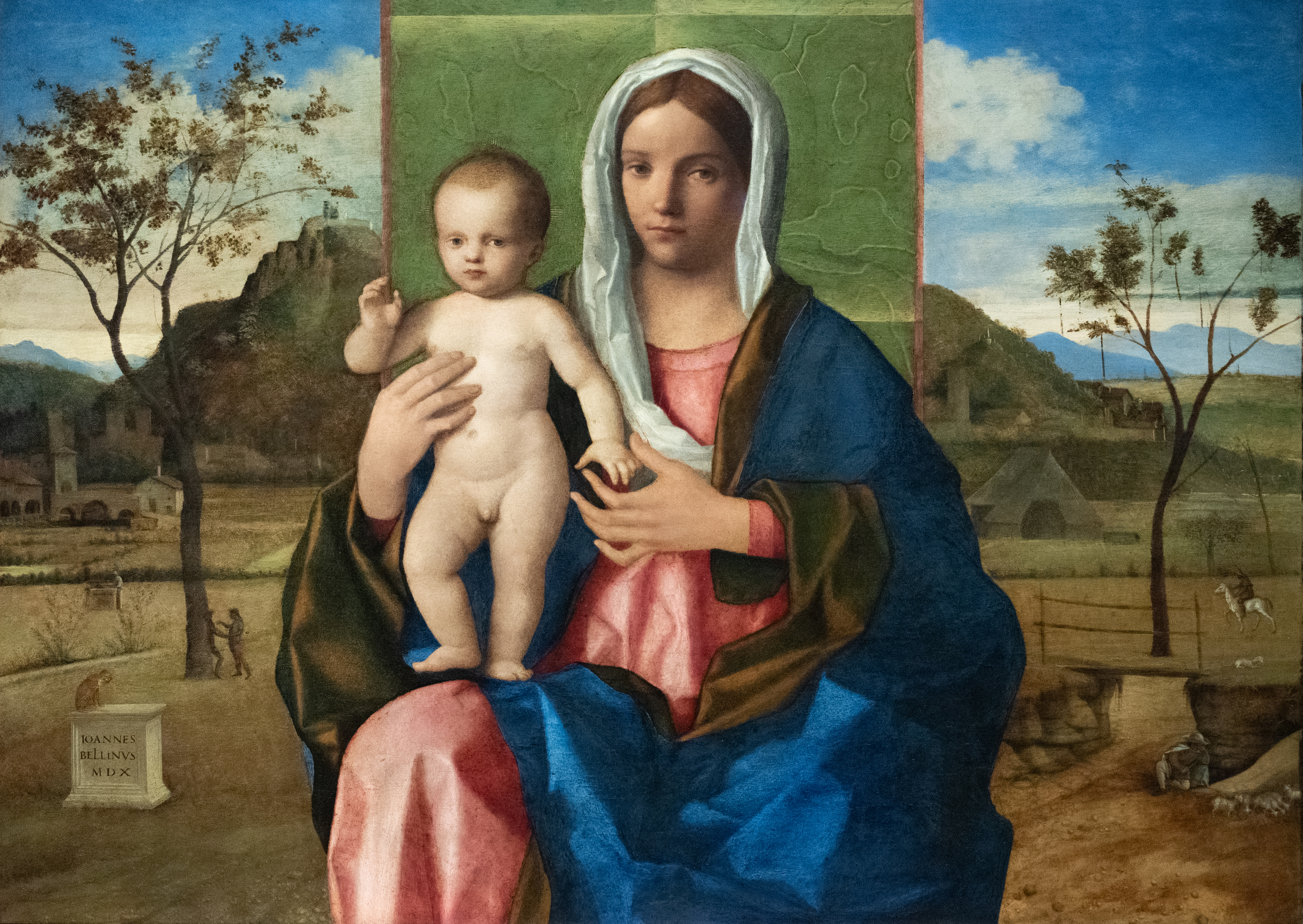
- Artist: Giovanni Bellini
- Year: 1510
- Medium: Oil on panel
- Dimensions: 85 cm × 118 cm (33 in × 46 in)
- Location: Pinacoteca di Brera, Milan

The 'Madonna and Child or Madonna with the Christ Child Blessing is a 1510 oil-on-panel painting by the Italian Renaissance master Giovanni Bellini, painted when he was already in his eighties but still responding to new developments in painting. It is similar to the 1505 Madonna del Prato (National Gallery, London) and the 1509 Madonna and Child (Detroit Institute of Arts). It is now in the Pinacoteca di Brera in Milan.

Restoration in 1986–1987 showed that there was no preparatory drawing under the landscape in the background and that he had often applied the paint to the preparation with his fingertips. The landscape in the background draws on Giorgione's innovations in landscape, the use of aerial perspective in the blue haze over the mountains and the more late Gothic study of detail from life which Bellini had learned under his father Jacopo – one example is the cheetah to the left, standing on a stone which bears his Latin signature and the date in Latin numerals (IOANNES BELLINUS MDX).

== See also ==
- Christ Child Blessing (1460)
- Madonna and Child (Bellini, Detroit) (1509)
- List of works by Giovanni Bellini
