= Madonna and Child Enthroned with Two Angels =

c. 1415 painting by Gentile da Fabriano

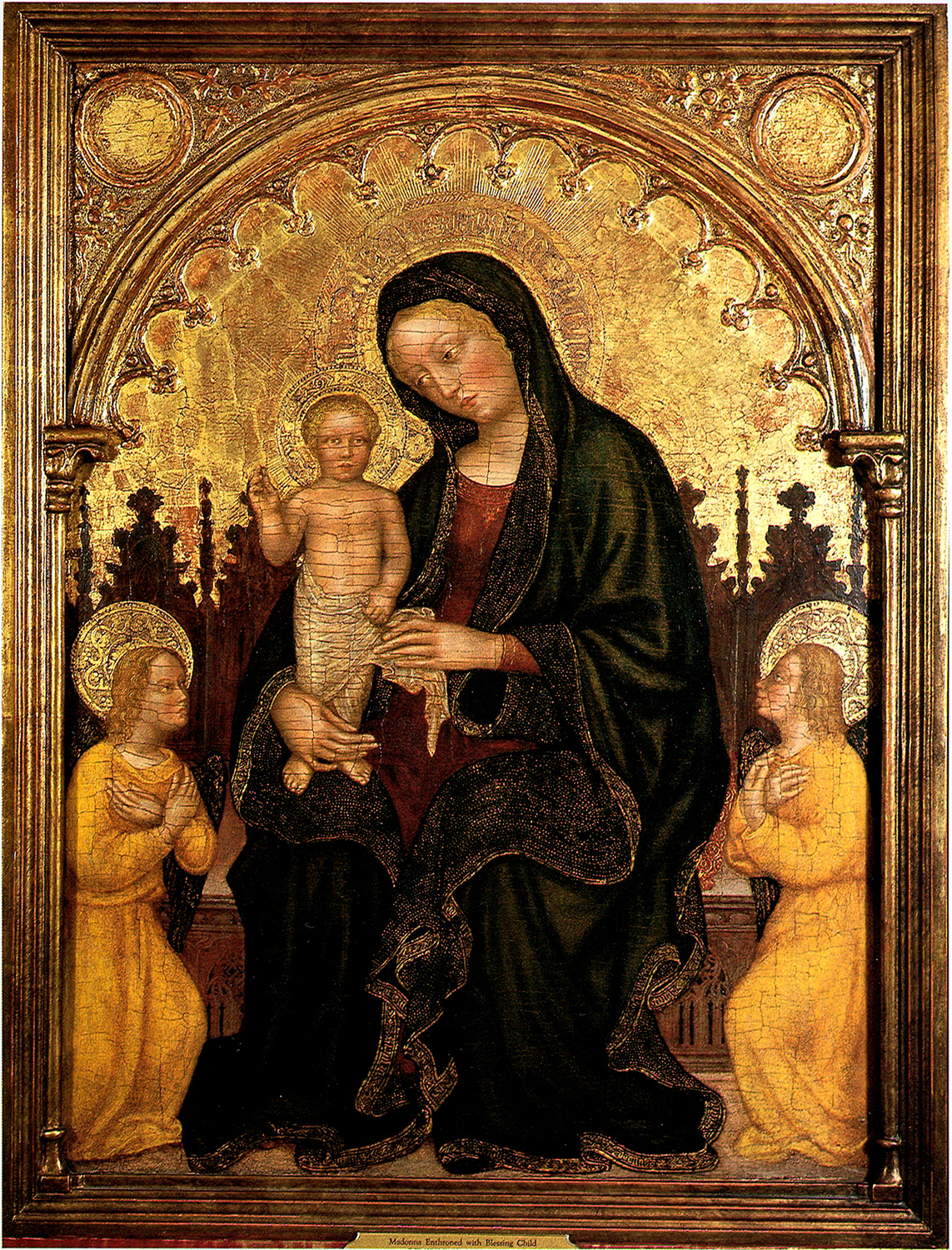
Madonna and Child Enthroned with Child and Two Angels (c. 1410–1415) by Gentile da Fabriano

Madonna and Child Enthroned with Two Angels is a c.1410–1415 tempera and gold on panel painting by the Italian late Gothic artist Gentile da Fabriano. Its original provenance is unknown, though its small size probably means it was made for private devotion. It is first recorded in the early 20th century, when it was in the Casa Persicini in Belluno, which suggests it links to the painter's time in Venice. It is now in the Philbrook Art Center in Tulsa, Oklahoma, United States.
