= Frederick Stibbert =

English art collector and businessman

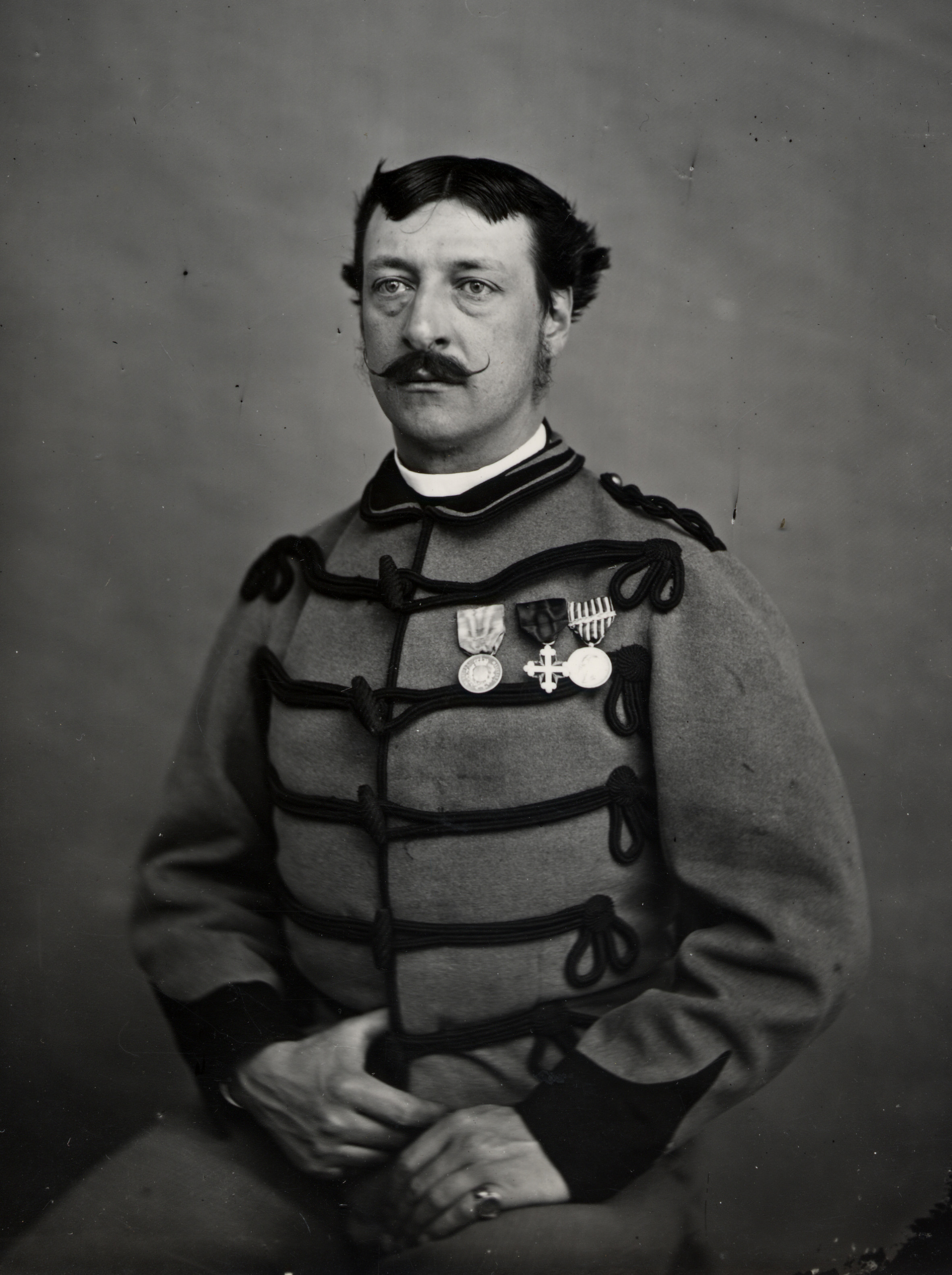
Frederick Stibbert

Frederick Stibbert (9 November 1838 – 10 April 1906) was an English art collector and businessman, although he was born in the Grand Duchy of Tuscany. His figure is mainly linked to the work to which he dedicated his entire life, the Stibbert Museum, gathering a collection of the most disparate genres of art and applied arts, with particular regard to the collection of ancient weapons and armors, among the most conspicuous and important in the world of its kind. His name is also spelled Federigo or Federico Stibbert.

== Biography ==
Stibbert was born in Florence, but was a British citizen. He was the son of Thomas Stibbert (1771-1847), an English military colonel of the Coldstream Guards, and Giulia Cafaggi (1805-1883), a young Tuscan woman. The Stibbert family was very wealthy, originally from Norfolk: Stibbert's grandfather, Giles Stibbert (1734-1809), was general commander in the East India Company and governor of Bengal.

Stibbert received a solid traditional education at Harrow School and Cambridge University. In 1849, after the death of his father, he moved with his mother and his two sisters, Sophronia and Erminia, in the villa of Montughi (the current Stibbert Museum), which his mother bought in 1849. As the last male of the family he inherited all the assets of both his father and his uncles.

On 5 December 1861 he was admitted to the Freemasonry in the Florentine Lodge "Concordia", of which he was a full member until 1891, the year in which he became honorary, while continuing to pay his contributions to the Lodge until his death. In 1866 he was a volunteer in the Garibaldi army at Condino, where he gained a silver medal.

Stibbert's life was always divided between Florence, where he was born, a city to which he was linked because of his affections and passions, and England, where he studied, a country to which he was bound by his work. Stibbert invested a significant part of his time and money in collecting and designing what is still the Stibbert Museum. In this work of constant collection he initially acted in a rather casual way and was dominated by his own taste (period 1860-1880), but as the museum project took shape he began to make more and more careful purchases and to reorganize the material already in his possession (period 1880-1906). The basic principle that gradually came to mature was to create something educational, especially for young people, aimed at stimulating an interest in the history of costume.

The armory initially represented the dominant sector of its interests, with a preference for Japanese weapons during the last part of its life. In particular for each type of weapon Stibbert thought of some real scenographic contexts: he studied appropriate mannequins on which to mount arms and armor and set up and decorated the rooms in order to make them suitable to what was contained. More generally, he restructured his residence and reorganized it from the perspective of the museum (today there are 64 rooms on two floors, for a total of 5,000 m2). The result was a hybrid in which the rooms of daily life merged with those of the collections, this means that there was not a part of the villa used as a dwelling and another used as an exhibition place, but that the house was the museum and the museum was the house. Over time he extended his passion for collecting to paintings, goldsmith's work, porcelains, costumes, fabrics, furnishing objects and books.

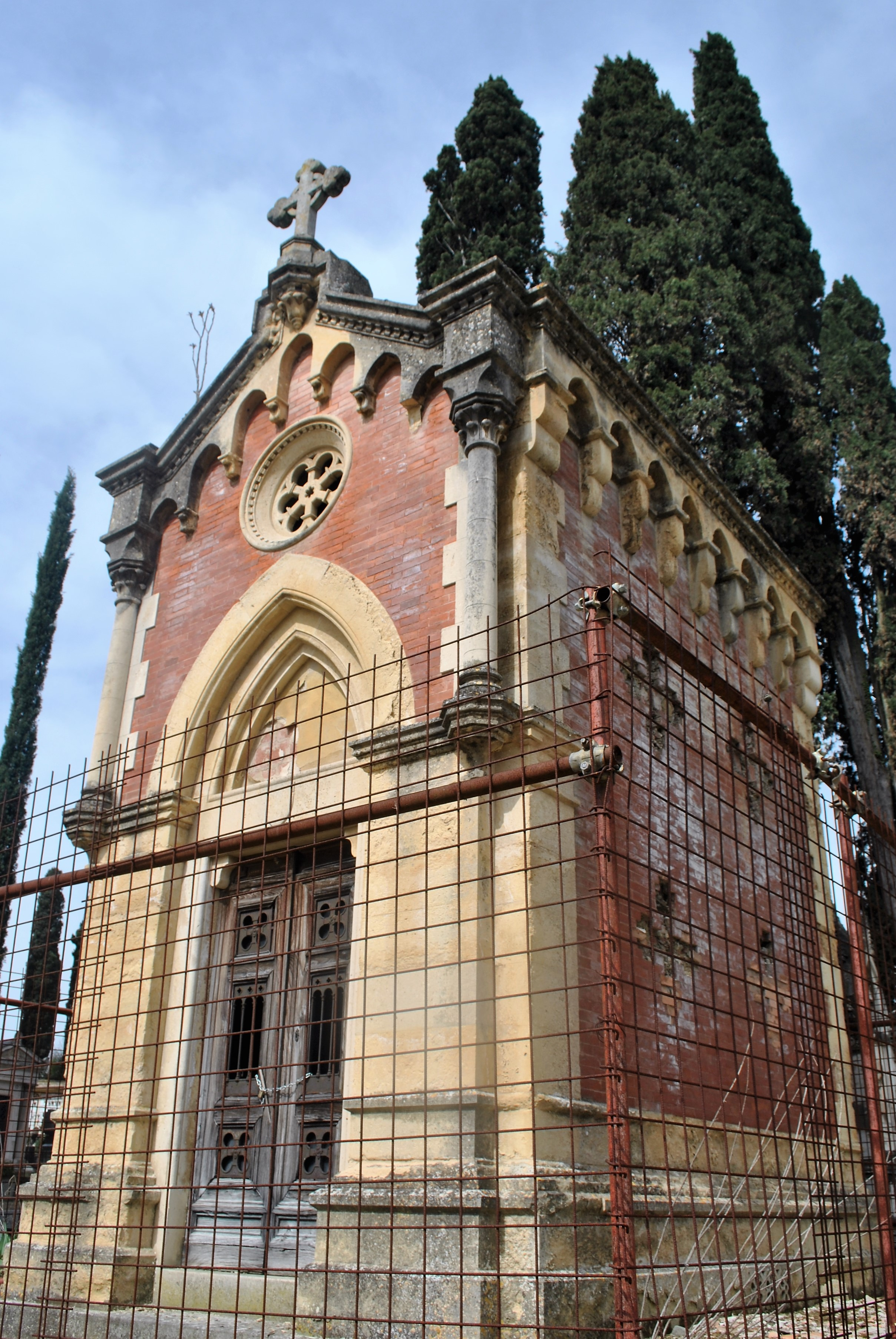
Stibbert Chapel, Cimitero degli Allori, Florence, Italy

On his travels Stibbert maintained a network of informers that kept him updated on the world antiques market. This allowed his research to take an international approach. Sometimes Stibbert was accused of being a "forger" because his group of craftsmen (a chief gunsmith and five workers) completed armor and operated restorations in an arbitrary manner. From this point of view, however, he was perfectly in line with the thought of his time. Stibbert spent a lot of money for his collection, and therefore for his museum, but always wisely and not neglecting his own affairs, so much so that he was able to preserve his heritage almost intact.

He never married and had no direct heirs. He devoted his whole life to what he called "my museum" in his will. In this will he expressed the desire that his collections (over 50,000 pieces) and the villa Montughi were established in a museum open to the public, but with the clause that the original location was respected. The British government was appointed as the first legatee, with the possibility, however, of withdrawing to the advantage of the city of Florence, which in fact took possession of it in 1908, establishing the Stibbert Opera Museum Foundation. The original designation of the British government as first legatee was due to the visit of Stibbert friend, Guy Francis Laking, keeper of the Armouries at Windsor Castle, who reminded Stibbert that he was an English citizen. Although initially Arthur Balfour said he wanted to accept the will, the British government later renounced its claim in favour of the city of Florence. Stibbert's friend, Henry Labouchère, who was living at Villa Montughi as well, helped the city of Florence in obtaining the museum .

Stibbert died on 10 April 1906 and is buried at the Cimitero degli Allori in Florence.
