= Madonna and Child (Filippo Lippi, Parma) =

C. 1450 painting by Filippo Lippi

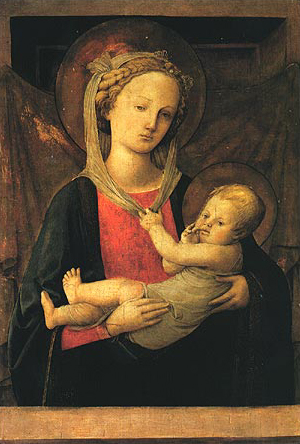
Madonna and Child (c. 1450–1455) by Filippo Lippi

Madonna and Child is a c. 1450–1455 tempera on panel painting by Filippo Lippi, now in the Magnani-Rocca Foundation in the Province of Parma in Italy. It is strongly influenced by Flemish works, particularly in the trompe-l'œil marble banister and the drape over the dark background. It also shows some similarities to the work of the Master of the Castello Nativity, who is thought to have been an assistant in Lippi's workshop.

Probably intended for private devotion, its commissioner is unknown. Pietro Toesca wrote of it in 1932, stating that at an unknown date it was in the contessa Foglietti's collection at Castello di Montauto near Florence.
