= Madonna and Child with Two Musician Angels =

c. 1515–1516 painting by Correggio

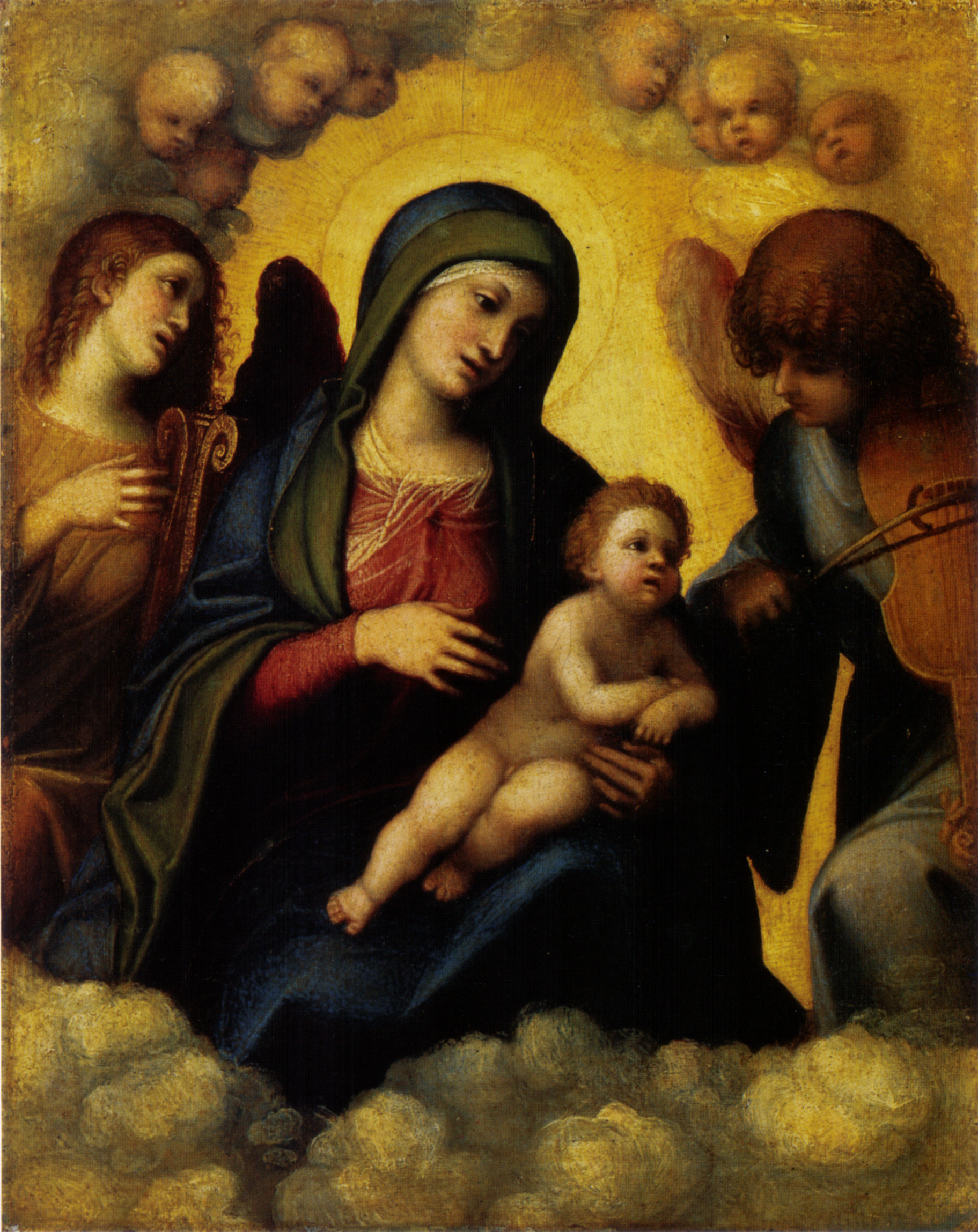

The Madonna and Child with Two Musician Angels is an oil-on-panel painting by the Italian Renaissance painter Correggio, now in the Uffizi in Florence, Italy. Some date it to 1514–15 but it is more commonly dated to 1515–16.

== History ==
On the back of the painting is a 16th-century monogram from the grand-ducal gallery in Florence, showing the identification number 2523, which does not feature in any of the lists of the gallery's holdings at that time. Though it cannot be clearly traced in any 17th-century inventories, it was probably one of the works taken to Düsseldorf by Anna Maria Luisa de' Medici in 1691 on her marriage to John William, Elector Palatine and which (after John William's death in 1717) were brought back to Florence. The first official mention places the work in the inventory of the Gallerie fiorentine in 1798, in the Sala dei Maestri Italiani, where it remained until the mid-19th century. Many copies were commissioned from the 18th century onwards, attesting to its popularity. It was then attributed to Titian, but Giovanni Morelli reattributed it as an early work by a young Correggio. This became the dominant attribution, supported by "the minute technical execution and the clear and shining colours".

== Bibliography ==
- (in Italian) Giuseppe Adani, Correggio pittore universale, Silvana Editoriale, Correggio 2007. ISBN 9788836609772
