= Madonna and Child (Cima, Este) =

Painting by Cima da Conegliano

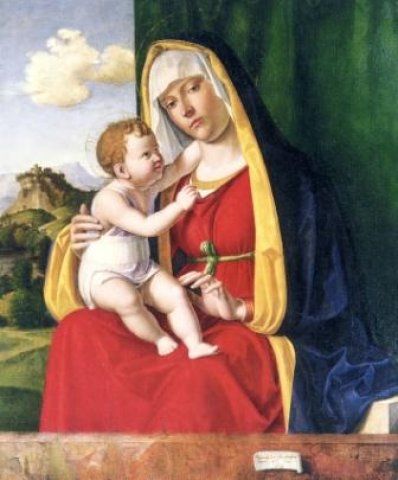
Madonna and Child (1504) by Cima da Conegliano

Madonna and Child is an oil-on-panel painting created in 1504 by the Italian Renaissance painter Cima da Conegliano, now in the Museo nazionale atestino in Este. It is the most important pictorial work in the museum, which is mainly dedicated to archeology.

The work is very similar to Uffizi Madonna, also dated from 1504. The position of the Madonna in this painting recalls the paintings by Giovanni Bellini (Madonna with Child and the Saints Catherine and Mary Magdalene) and is very similar to that of the other nineteen Madonnas of the artist.
