= Madonna and Child with the Infant John the Baptist =

Madonna and Child with the Infant John the Baptist may refer to:

- Madonna and Child with the Infant Saint John the Baptist, (Leonardo), 1470s
- Virgin and Child with the Infant John the Baptist (Botticelli, Cleveland), c. 1490
- Virgin and Child with the Infant John the Baptist (Botticelli, São Paulo), c. 1490–1500
- Madonna and Child with the Infant Saint John the Baptist (Bellini), 1490–1495
- Madonna and Child with the Infant John the Baptist (Perugino), 1497
- Madonna and Child with the Infant John the Baptist (Correggio, Chicago), 1513–1514
- Madonna with Child with Young John the Baptist (Cranach), 1514
- Madonna and Child with the Infant John the Baptist (Correggio, Madrid), 1518
- Virgin and Child Enthroned with the Young John the Baptist (Granacci), 1519
- Madonna and Child with the Infant Saint John the Baptist (Pontormo), c. 1530
- Madonna and Child with the Infant John the Baptist and Saint Barbara (Daniele da Volterra), 1548

== See also ==
- Virgin of the Rocks (Leonardo da Vinci), 1483–1486 and 1495–1508
- Manchester Madonna (Michelangelo), c. 1497
- The Virgin and Child with Saint Anne and Saint John the Baptist (Leonardo da Vinci), c. 1499–1500 or c. 1506–1508
- Pitti Tondo (Michelangelo), c. 1503–1505
- Taddei Tondo (Michelangelo), c. 1504–1505
