= Virgin and Child with Two Angels (Botticelli, Naples) =

Painting by Sandro Botticelli

- Madonna and Child with Two Angels
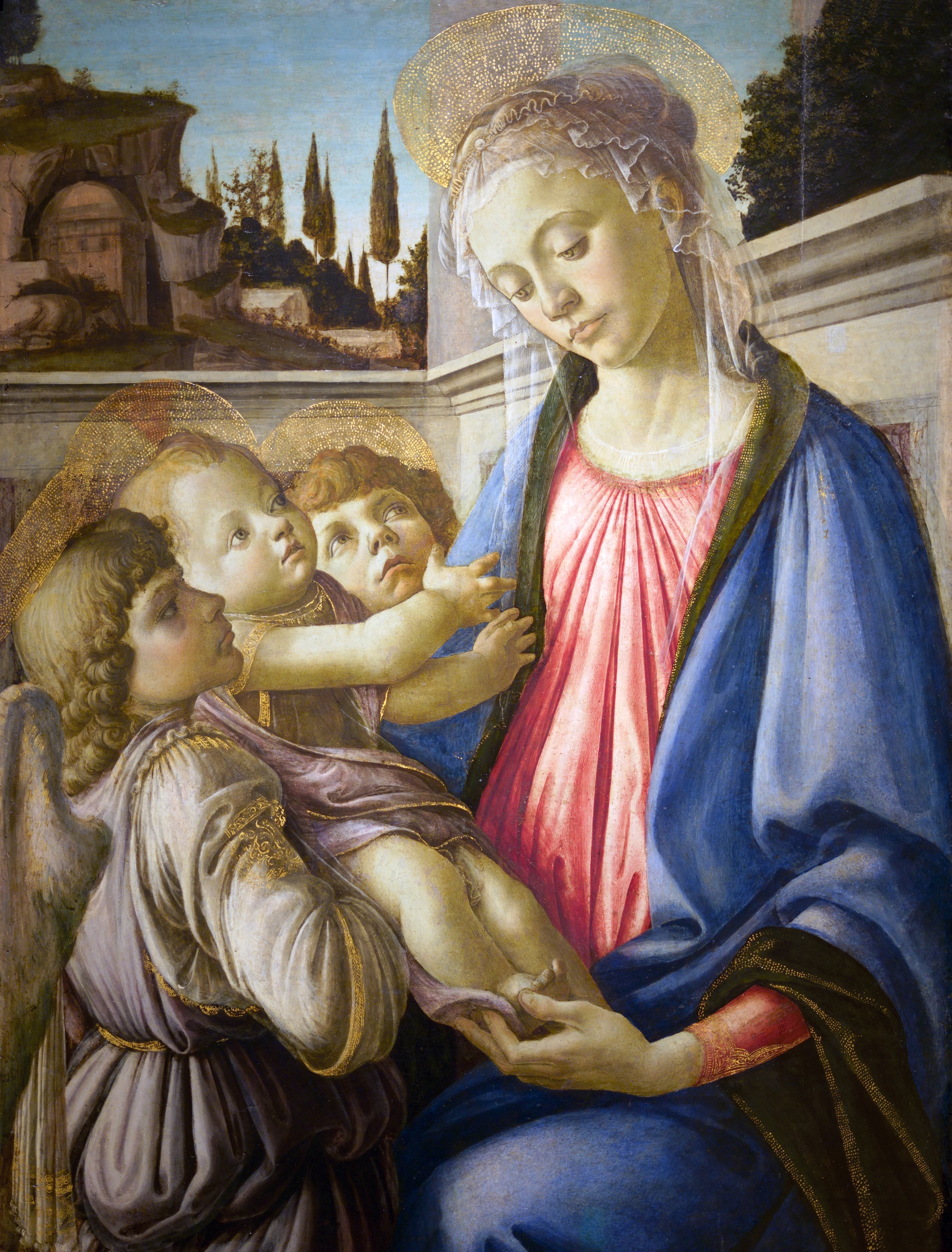
- Artist: Sandro Botticelli
- Year: c. 1468
- Medium: Tempera on panel
- Dimensions: 100 cm × 71 cm (39 in × 28 in)
- Location: Museo Nazionale di Capodimonte, Naples

The Virgin and Child with Two Angels is a painting by the Italian Renaissance master Sandro Botticelli, dating to c. 1468. It is in the Museo Nazionale di Capodimonte, in Naples.

The work was once attributed to Filippino Lippi, master of Botticelli. The composition essentially derives from Botticelli's master (and Filippino Lippi's father) Filippo Lippi. The faces and other details suggest that the work is of around the same period as Botticelli's Fortitude and his other early Madonnas. The composition is similar to that of Andrea del Verrocchio's Virgin and Child with Two Angels, probably dating to a year or two earlier.

== See also ==
- List of works by Sandro Botticelli

== Bibliography ==
- Legouix, Susan, Botticelli, 2004 (revised edition), Chaucer Press, ISBN 1904449212
