= Madonna and Child (Bellini, Detroit) =

Painting by Giovanni Bellini

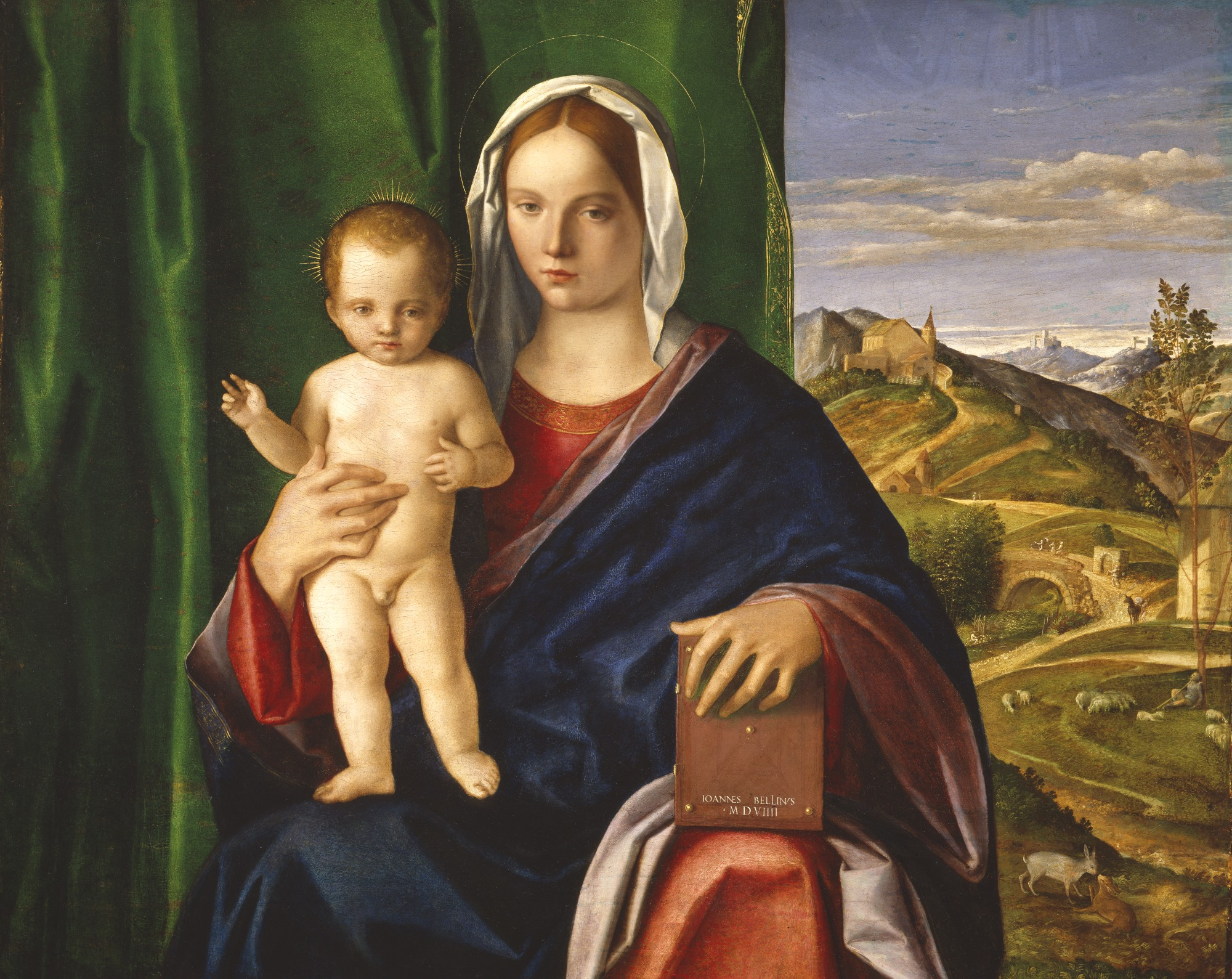
- Artist: Giovanni Bellini
- Year: 1509
- Medium: oil on panel
- Dimensions: 80 cm × 106 cm (31 in × 42 in)
- Location: Detroit Institute of Arts, Detroit
- Website: Catalogue entry

The Madonna and Child or Madonna with the Christ Child Blessing is a 1509 oil-on-panel painting by the Italian Renaissance master Giovanni Bellini, commissioned by the Mocenigo family and remaining with them until 1815. It is now in the Detroit Institute of Arts.

== Similar works and symbolism ==
It shows similarities to his 1505 Madonna del Prato (London) and his 1510 Madonna and Child (Milan); all three have a Giorgione-influenced landscape background (here with a shepherd or villager), separated from the figures by a green curtain and with hazy blue mountains in the far background obeying the rules of aerial perspective. The landscape or meadow in the background symbolises the medieval symbol of Mary's virginity, the hortus conclusus. In her left hand Mary holds a book, a symbol of her fulfilment of Old Testament prophecies; on its front cover are the date and the artist's signature.

== Ownership ==
It was recorded as belonging to Marie-Caroline de Bourbon-Sicile, duchesse de Berry and hanging in Palazzo Vendramin Calergi (her Venetian home) between around 1844 and 1854 before an attempt was made to auction it in Paris on 19 April 1865 on behalf of the Duchesse du Berry or her son Henri, Count of Chambord. However, it did not sell and so remained with the Duchesse, who moved it to Austria in 1868. It passed to the Count on her death in 1870, then to his widow Maria Theresa in 1883 and finally to the Count's niece on Maria Theresa's death. The niece died in 1893, passing it to another member of the Bourbon family, Jaime, Duke of Madrid. Its final private owner was the Vicomte de Canson, who sold it to its present owner in 1928.

== See also ==
- Christ Child Blessing (1460)
- Madonna and Child (Bellini, Milan, 1510)
- List of works by Giovanni Bellini
