= Madonna and Child (Bellini, Pavia) =

Painting by Giovanni Bellini

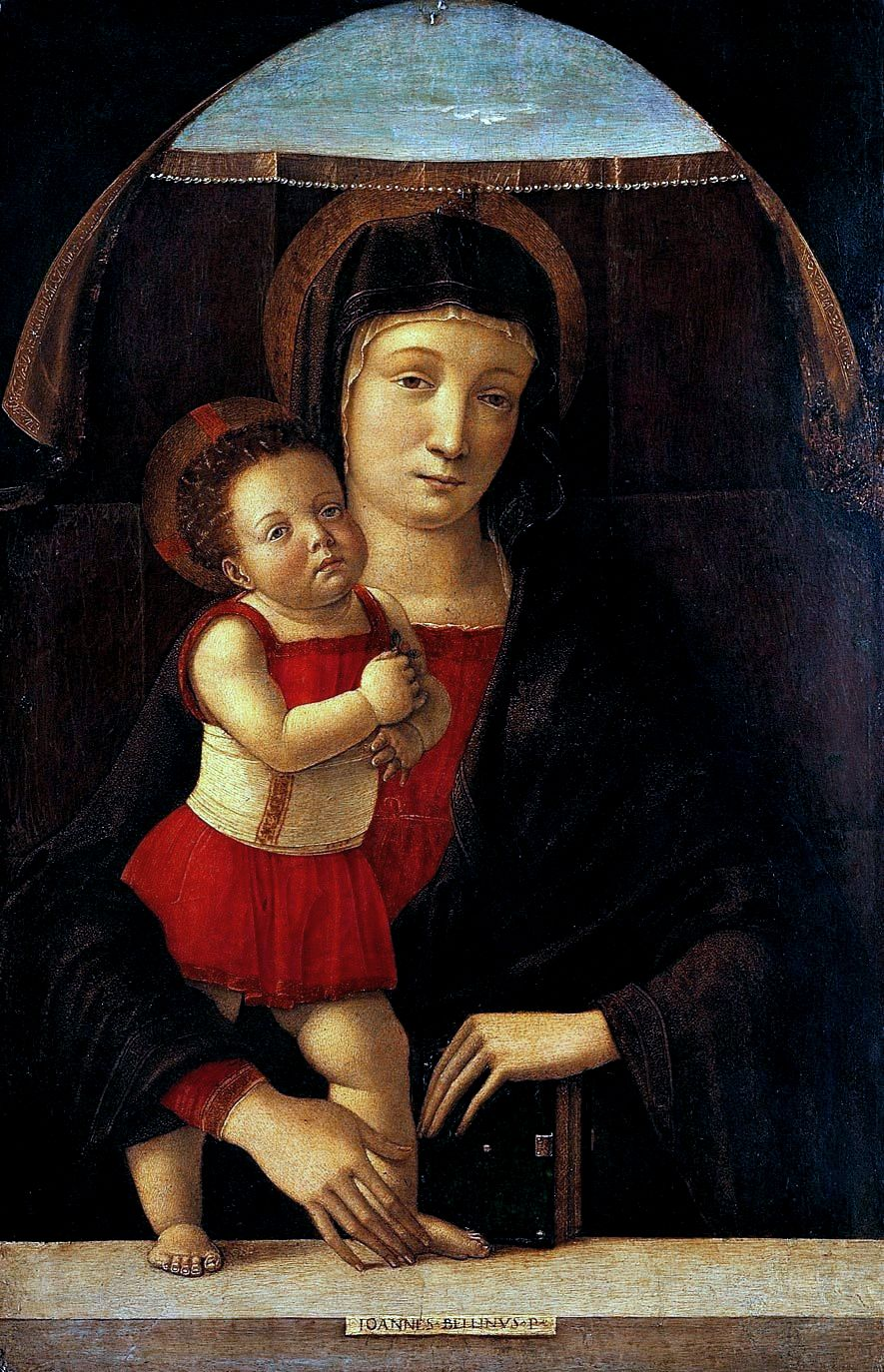
- Artist: Giovanni Bellini
- Year: c.1450–1460
- Medium: tempera on panel
- Dimensions: 47 cm × 31,5 cm (19 in × 124 in)
- Location: Pinacoteca Malaspina, Pavia

The Madonna and Child is a tempera-on-panel painting usually attributed to the Italian Renaissance artist Giovanni Bellini, dated to 1450–1460 or to 1450–1455 by Pignatti, though Olivari and others consider this to be too early. In the 14SS50s the painter was still heavily influenced by his father Jacopo and by Bartolomeo Vivarini. The strong line used for the Christ Child also shows the influence of Francesco Squarcione and his studio on the young Bellini. The general composition is based on a widely copied Byzantine icon in Venice, whilst the Christ Child holds a Flemish-style scroll bearing the artist's signature. The painting is closely linked to a similar work now in Philadelphia. It is now in the Pinacoteca Malaspina in Pavia.

== See also ==
- List of works by Giovanni Bellini
