= Madonna and Child (Correggio, Vienna) =

Painting attributed to Antonio da Correggio

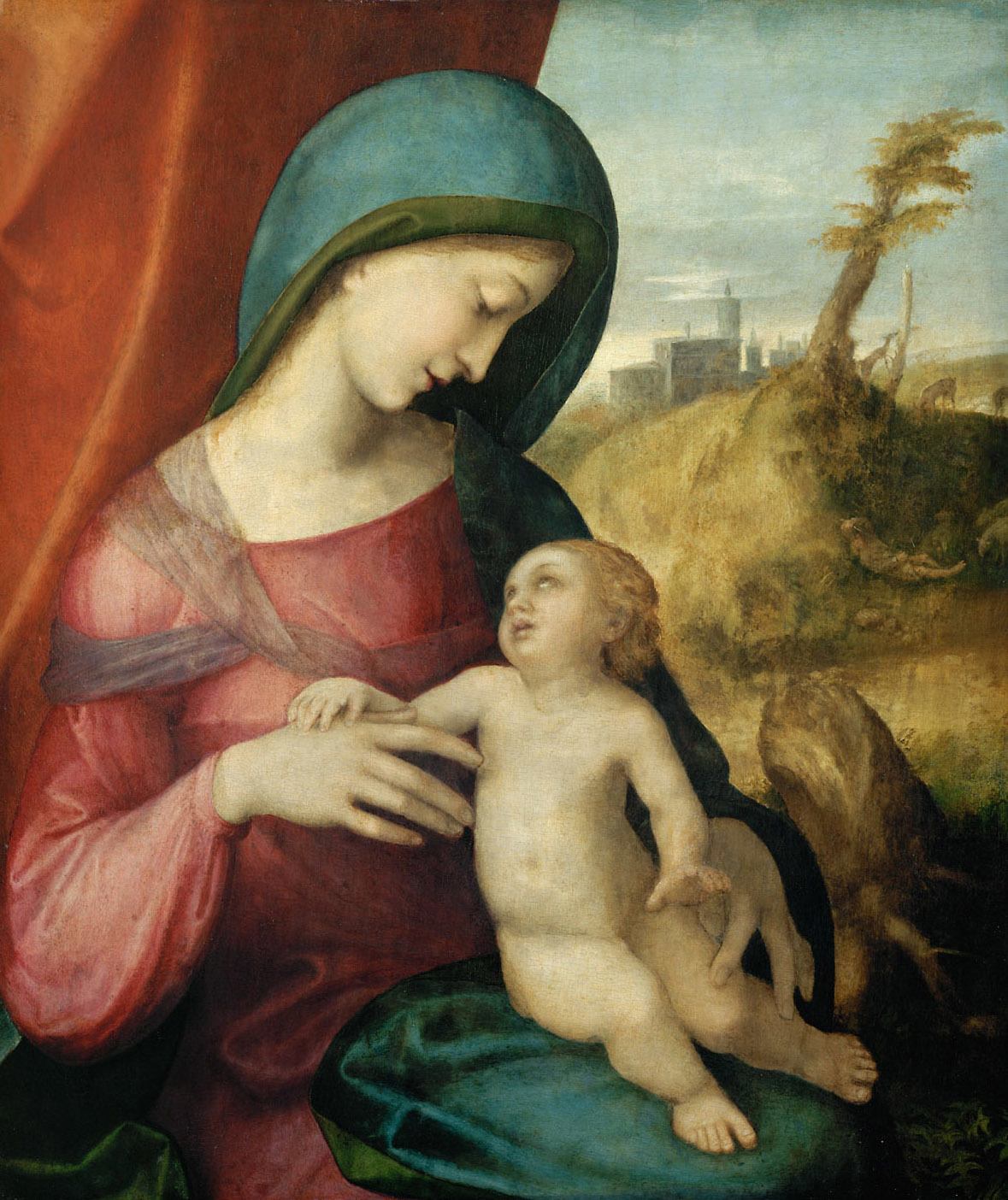

Madonna and Child is a 65 by 45 cm oil on canvas painting. It dates to 1512-1514 and is attributed to Correggio but this attribution is uncertain. It was rediscovered in Hohensalzburg Castle in 1928 and given to the Kunsthistorisches Museum in Vienna, where it now hangs.
