= Madonna and Child (Cima, Amsterdam) =

Painting by Cima da Conegliano

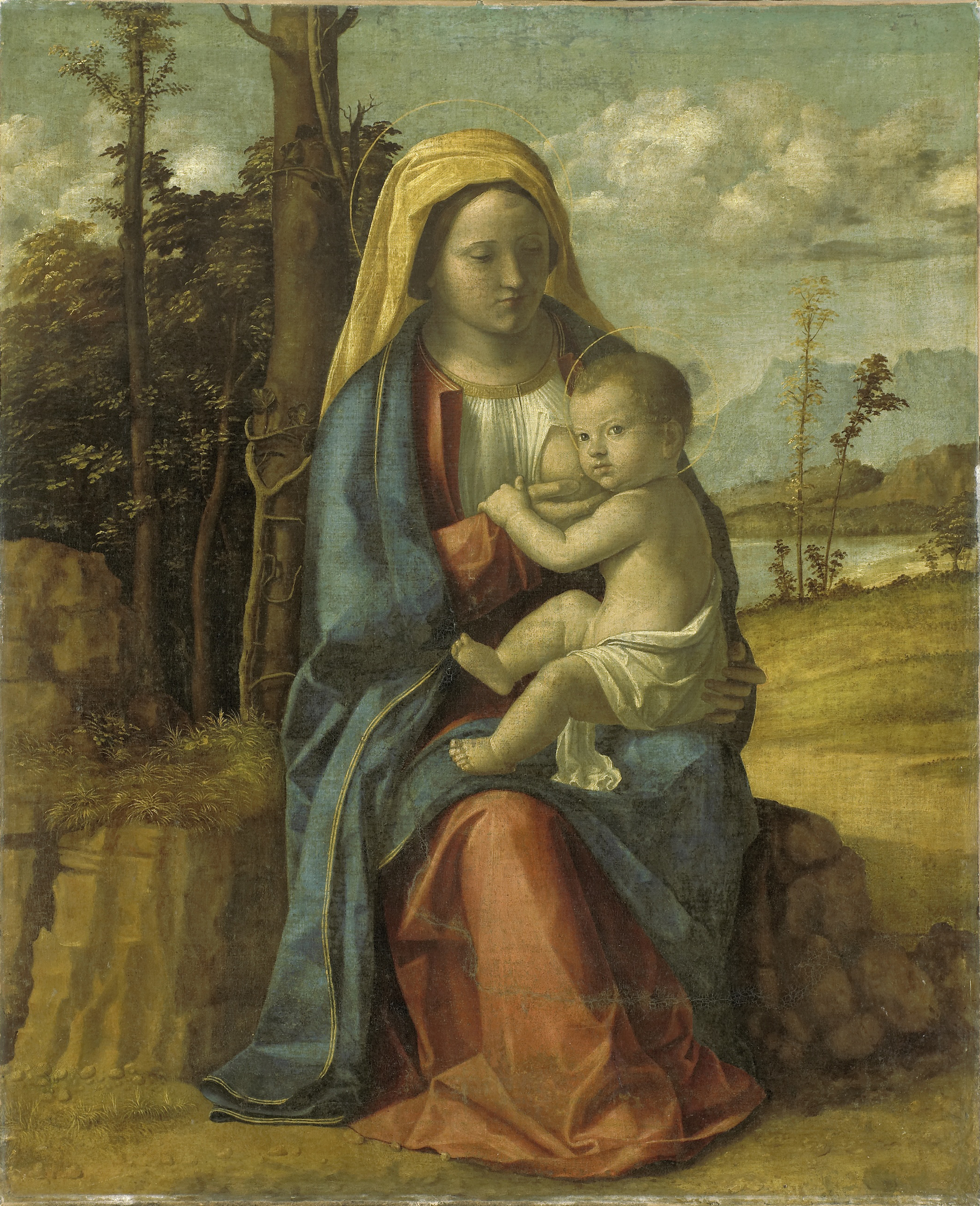
Madonna and Child (1512–1517) by Cima da Conegliano

Madonna and Child is a 1512–1517 oil on canvas painting by Cima da Conegliano, now in the Rijksmuseum in Amsterdam.
