= Madonna and Child (Cima, Minneapolis) =

Painting by Cima da Conegliano

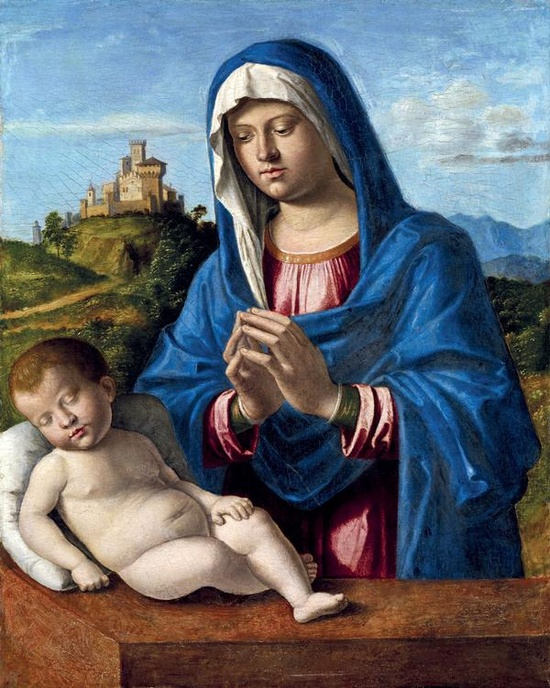
Madonna and Child (1500–1504) by Cima da Conegliano

Madonna and Child is an oil-on-panel painting created ca. 1500–1504 by the Italian artist Cima da Conegliano, now in the Minneapolis Institute of Arts.
