= Museo Stibbert =

Museum in Florence, Italy

Coordinates: 43°47′34.38″N 11°15′18.63″E

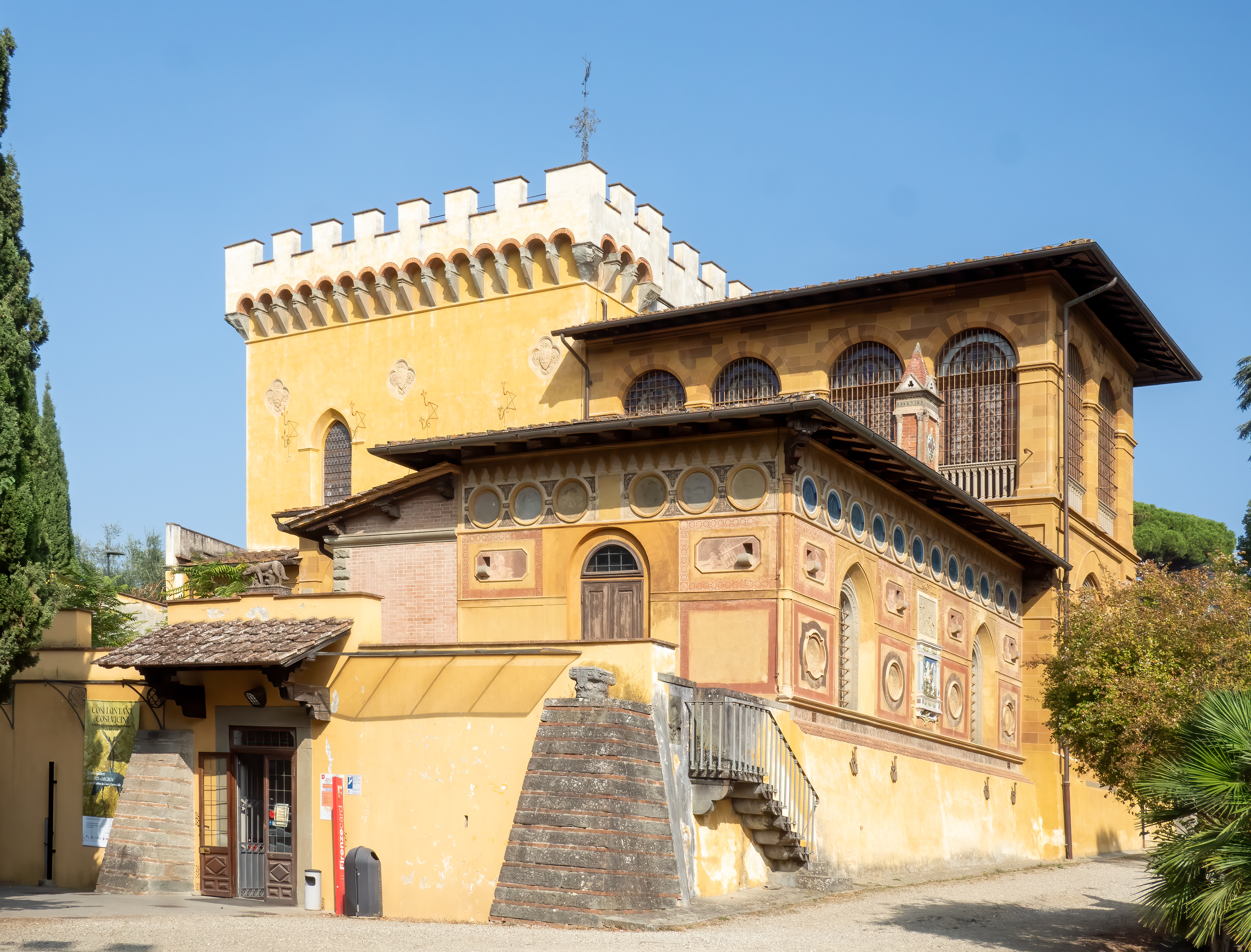
- Location: 26 Via Frederick Stibbert, Florence, Italy
- Website: www.museostibbert.it

The Museo Stibbert is a museum on Via Frederick Stibbert on the hill of Montughi in Florence, Italy. It contains over 36,000 artefacts, including a vast collection of armour from Eastern and Western civilisations.

== History of the family and museum ==
The museum was founded by Frederick Stibbert (1838–1906). His father was English and his mother Italian; he received his education in England. The Stibbert family's extreme wealth came from Frederick's grandfather, Giles Stibbert, who was the commander in chief for the British East India Company in Bengal at the end of the 18th century and ruled as governor for many years.

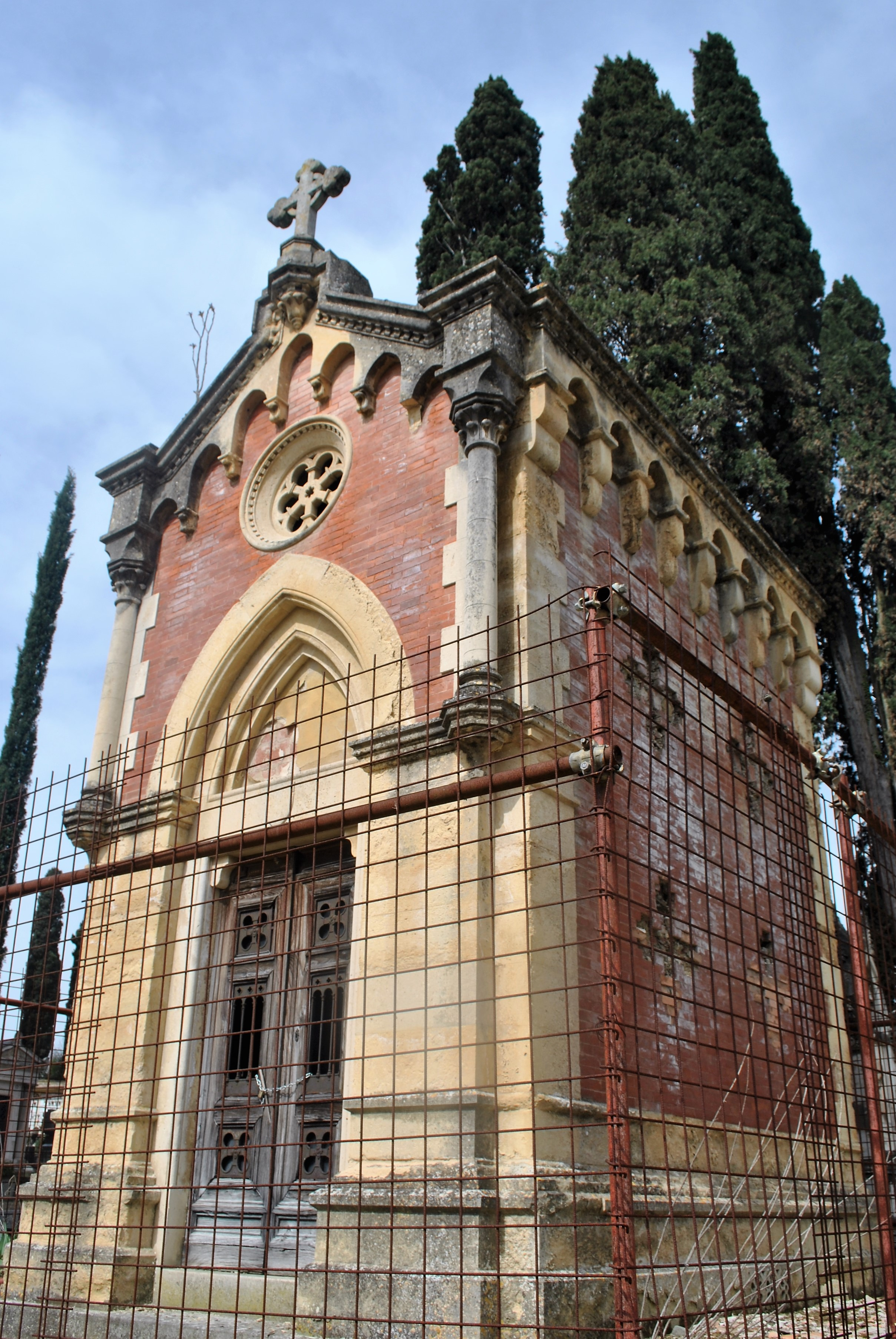
Stibbert Chapel, Cimitero degli Allori, Florence

Frederick Stibbert inherited the entire estate from his grandfather and did not work for the rest of his life. Instead, he dedicated his life to collecting objects, antiques and artefacts, and turned his villa into a museum. When the size of the collections outgrew the villa, Stibbert hired the architect Giuseppe Poggi, the painter Gaetano Bianchi and the sculptor Passaglia to add on rooms.

When Stibbert died in 1906 his collection was given to the city of Florence and was opened to the public. Stibbert and his family are buried at the Cimitero Evangelico agli Allori, Florence.

== The museum ==
The villa, which was once Stibbert's home, comprises 57 rooms in which his entire collection of objects from around the world is exhibited. Most of the walls are covered in leather and tapestries, and the rooms are crowded with artefacts. Paintings are displayed throughout every room, including still lifes and portraits. There is also valuable furniture, porcelain, Tuscan crucifixes, Etruscan artefacts and an outfit worn by Napoleon.

The museum contains a café and a bookshop.

=== Arms and armour ===
The most extensive collection is around 16,000 pieces of European, Oriental, Islamic and Japanese arms and armour from the 15th century to the 19th century. The cavalcade room is a grand hall filled with fourteen figures of 16th-century knights on horseback and fourteen foot-soldiers, dressed in armour and holding weapons. The collection of Samurai armour contains over 80 suits and hundreds of swords.
