= Virgin and Child with Saint Anne (disambiguation) =

Virgin and Child with Saint Anne is a subject in Christian art showing Saint Anne with the Virgin Mary and her son Jesus Christ.

Virgin and Child with Saint Anne may also refer to:

- Virgin and Child with Saint Anne (Dürer)
- The Virgin and Child with Saint Anne (Leonardo)
- Virgin and Child with Saint Anne (Masaccio)
- The Virgin and Child with St. Anne (van Steffeswert)
- Virgin and Child with St. Anne (Sangallo) by Francesco da Sangallo
- Madonna and Child with St. Anne (Dei Palafrenieri) by Caravaggio
- Enthroned Saint Anne with the Virgin and Christ Child by Angelos Akotantos

== See also ==
- Virgin and Child with Saint Anne and Four Saints by Jacopo Pontormo
- The Virgin and Child with Saint Anne and Saint John the Baptist by Leonardo da Vinci
