= Madonna and Child (Lippi) =

Painting by Filippo Lippi

Madonna and Child (Lippina)
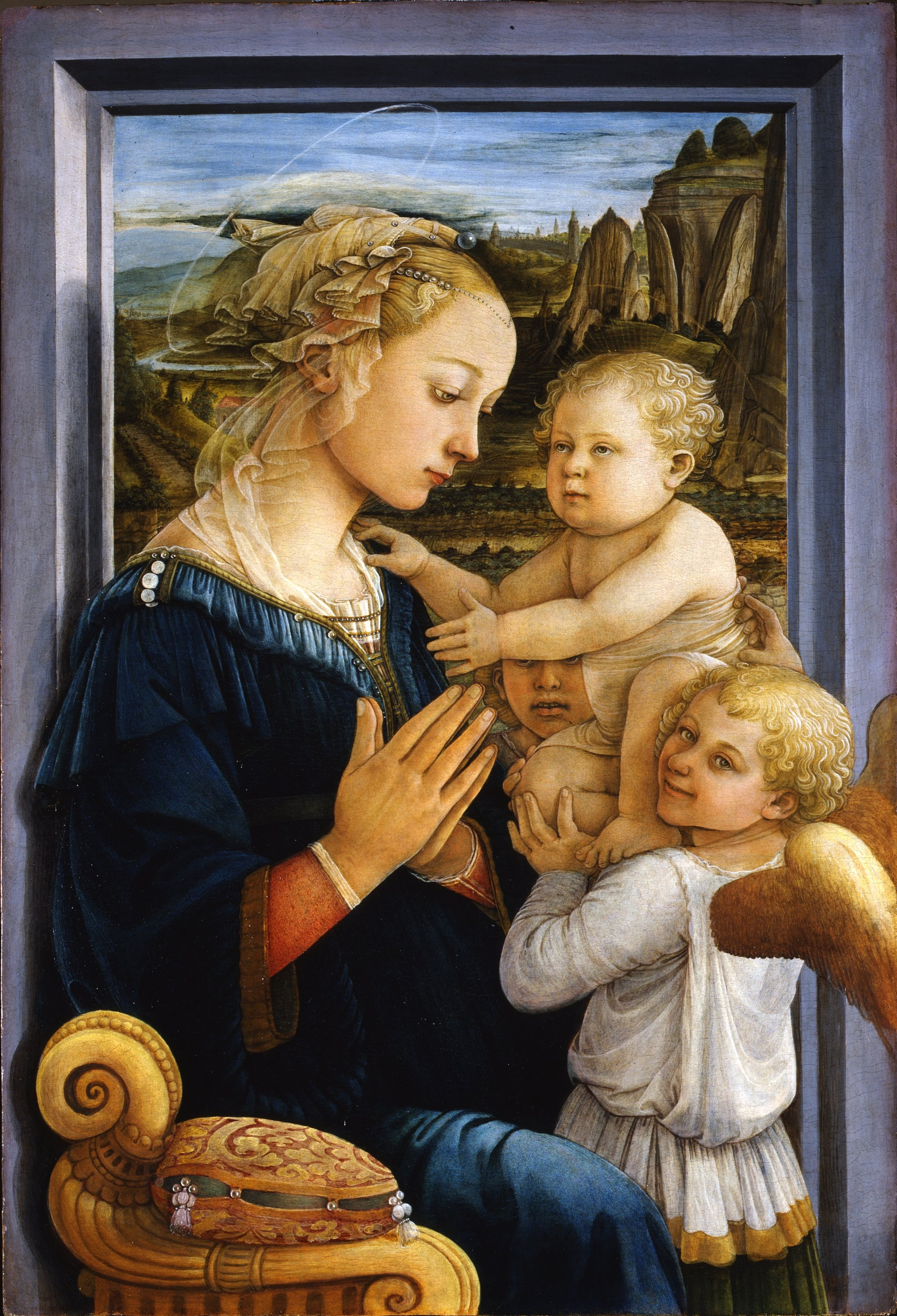
- Artist: Filippo Lippi
- Year: c. 1450–1465
- Medium: Tempera on panel
- Dimensions: 92 cm × 63.5 cm (36 in × 25.0 in)
- Location: Uffizi Gallery, Florence

Madonna with Child (Italian: Madonna col Bambino e angeli or Lippina) is a painting by the Italian Renaissance artist Filippo Lippi. The date in which it was executed is unknown, but most art historians agree that it was painted during the last part of Lippi's career, between 1450 and 1465. It is one of the few works by Lippi which was not executed with the help of his workshop and was an influential model for later depictions of the Madonna and Child, including those by Sandro Botticelli. The painting is housed in the Uffizi Gallery, Florence, Italy, and is therefore commonly called “The Uffizi Madonna” among art historians.

== Background ==
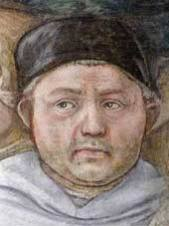
A self-portrait of Fra Filippo Lippi.

Fra Filippo was born in 1406 in Florence to a poor family where his father was a butcher. He entered a monastery with his brother at an early age. Later in his life, he was moved to a monastery in Prato, and here fell in love with a nun, Lucrezia Buti, with whom he had two children. He encountered more trouble when his patrons claimed that Fra Filippo did not fulfill his contracts. Fra Filippo's main patrons were the Medicis.

== History ==
The commission and the exact execution date of the painting are unknown. In 1457, Giovanni de’ Medici wished to gift a panel to the King of Naples and commissioned Fra Filippo to paint it. Fra Filippo, who was working in Prato at that time, decided to temporarily return to his residence in Florence to work on this project. Fra Filippo wrote letters to Giovanni that show that the painter abandoned the project because of a lack of funding. Although art historian Ulmann believes that Fra Filippo presented the Uffizi Madonna to Giovanni to thank him for acting as an intermediary between him and the King of Naples, Edward C. Strutt states that this belief is incorrect. However, he also states that the Uffizi Madonna was in all probability executed around this time, while Fra Filippo was staying in Florence. This is also demonstrated by the techniques that Fra Filippo used to realize this painting: the blunt execution and the bold colors highlight how the painter was influenced by the technique of fresco painting. Since he acquired such techniques by working at the Prato Cathedral, long before he moved to Florence, Strutt believes that Fra Filippo must have executed this painting after his time working at the Cathedral.

The Madonna is traditionally identified with Lucrezia Buti, as for most of Fra Filippo's Madonnas.

Another possible interpretation of the painting is that the unusual size is perhaps connected to a personal event, such as the birth of his son, Filippino (1457): however, if Filippino was chosen as model for the angel in the foreground, the panel could be from a date as late as around 1465.

An 18th-century inscription in the rear of the panel testifies the presence of the painting in the Medici Villa del Poggio Imperiale at the time. On 13 May 1796 it entered the Gran Ducal collections in Florence, which formed the base of the future Uffizi museum.

== Description ==
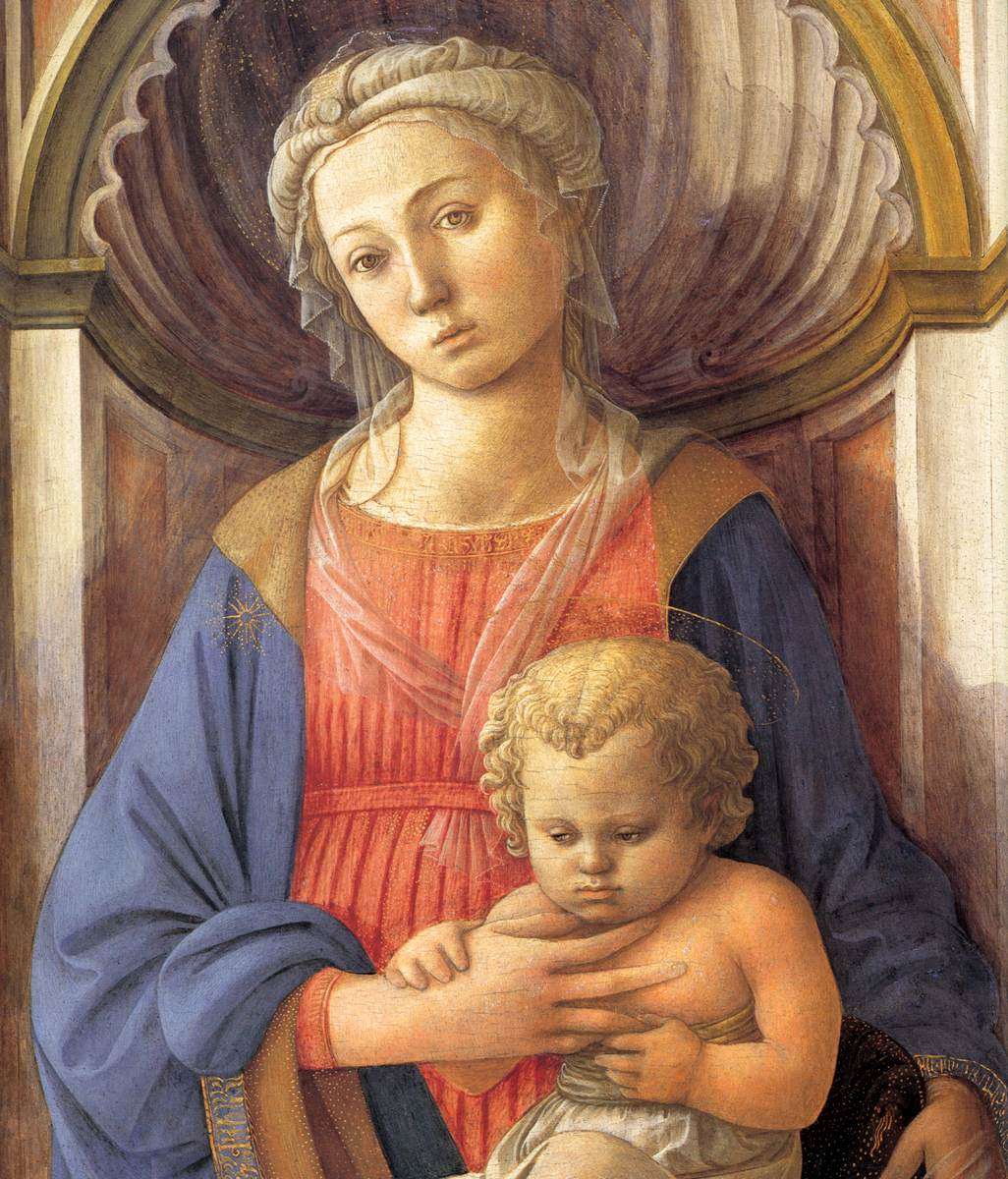
Fra Filippo's National Gallery of Art Madonna and Child, c. 1440, one of the artist's earlier Madonnas.

The Uffizi Madonna is associated with the taste of the new age, as the Madonna is “lovelier and more fashionable than any of Filippo’s earlier Madonnas”. The group of Madonna and Child is, unusually for the period, placed in front of an open window beyond which is a landscape inspired to Flemish painting. The Madonna sits on a chair, at the window of a house located on a hilltop, which offers a view of an elaborate landscape of “plains, distant mountains, a city and a bay”. Her eyes are pointed down and her hands are folded in prayers before child Jesus, who is held up to her by two angels. She is wearing an elaborate coiffure with a soft veil and pearls: these elements, along with her costume, represent the elegance of the mid-1400s and were re-used in numerous late 15th-century works in Florence. Furthermore, as in many Renaissance paintings, the Madonna's hair is shaved farther back because, “the forehead [was] an object of special beauty” that resembled “a glowing, beautifully set pearl”.

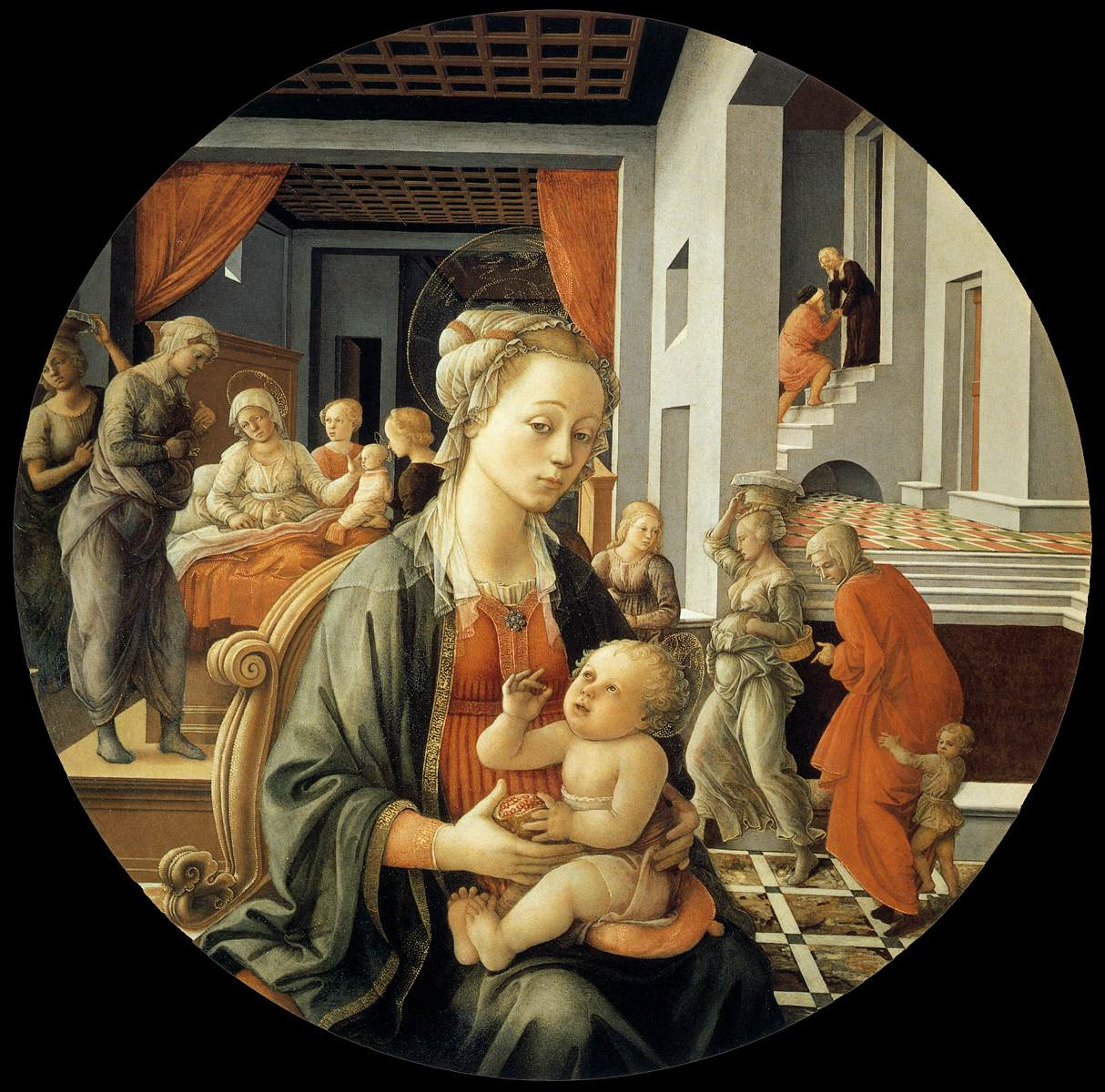
Fra Filippo's Madonna with the Child and Scenes from the Life of St Anne, also known as the Pitti tondo. It is closely related to the Uffizi Madonna.

This Madonna resembles other Madonnas from the same artist. For example, it is closely related to Fra Filippo's Pitti tondo Madonna, but it lacks “the pathetic girlish loveliness” of the Pitti tondo and rather has “a more womanly and mature type of beauty”.

The angel on the right looks at the viewer with a “roguish smile, more expressive of mischief than of seraphic perfection”.

== Technique ==
The large window placed behind the Madonna helps reducing the gap between the viewer and the figures, which are also very close to the plane to assist in making the viewer feel part of the painting.

Fra Filippo's fresco background from his time in Prato influences this painting from the coloring and the inattention to details. The colors are applied in bold strokes, that almost look independent from each other, which shows that Fra Filippo was “taking very little trouble to ensure harmonious blending of the various tints”, which is a characteristic of frescoes. The composition of the painting is of pyramidal shape, and the foreground and background are arranged in a way that suggest that Fra Filippo was also influenced by the methods of Donatello’s school.

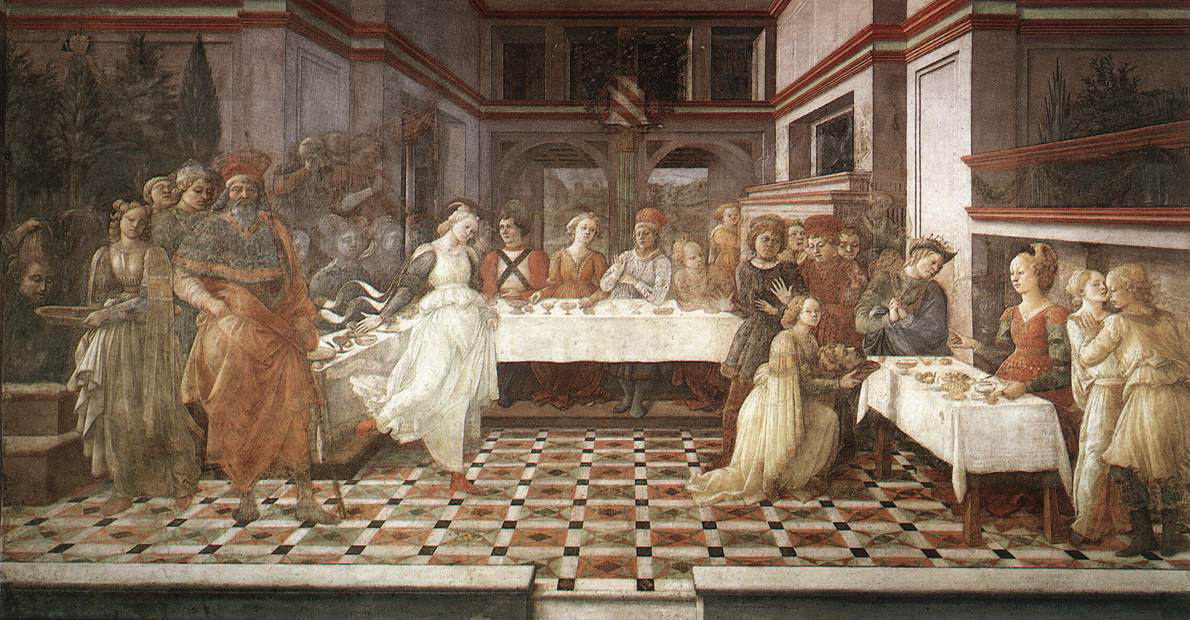
The Feast of Herod, a fresco by Fra Filippo, part of Stories of St. Stephen and St. John the Baptist, c. 1452–1465.

From his earlier paintings, it is evident that Fra Filippo was influenced by Masaccio. However, Masaccio’s chiaroscuro has disappeared in the Uffizi Madonna, and figures are now illuminated by a soft glow with harsh shadows. This greatly reduces the sense of volume that was peculiar in Fra Filippo’s earlier paintings.

== Symbolism ==
This painting contains religious symbols: there are rocks and the seashore outside the window, which are recurrent themes in Florentine Renaissance paintings. The seashore probably alludes to the Virgin Mary’s title “star of the sea and port of our salvation”, and the rocks allude to the tales of prophet Daniel.

== Interpretation ==
External videos
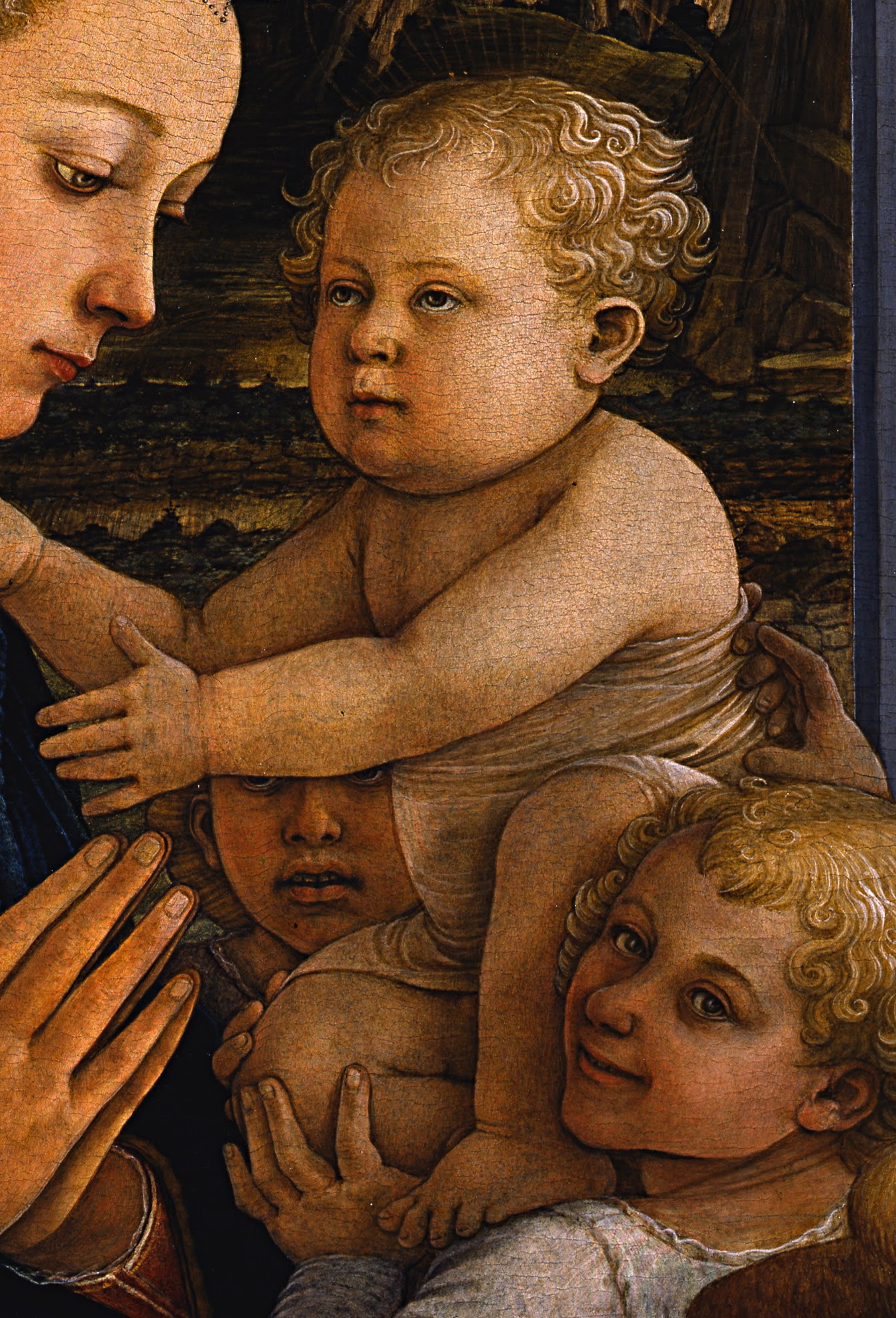
- Fra Filippo Lippi, Smarthistory

The angel on the right has always been of particular importance to art historians. Marylin Lavin argues that the Uffizi Madonna “should be understood as a representation of the marriage of Christ and the Virgin Mary”. According to Barnaby Nygren, the fact that the Madonna is not holding the child, but rather he is being presented to her argues Lavin's interpretation. However, Bernard Berenson argues that “the relationship between bride and groom is not as the Virgin Mary and Christ but rather as the individual devout soul and God”. Finally, Jonathan Jones argues that the Madonna is “one of the most beautiful paintings of the Renaissance” and an exemplification of the humanizing of religion that dates back to Giotto. According to him, Fra Filippo, with this painting, makes the relation between the Madonna and the child that of a real mother and baby.

== Sources ==
- Berenson, Bernard (1959). The Italian Painters of the Renaissance. Cromwell Place, London: The Phaidon Press.
- Fossi, Gloria (2004). Uffizi. Florence: Giunti.
- Hartt, Fredrick. History of Italian Renaissance Art. Englewood Cliffs, N.J, and New York: Prentice-Hall, Inc. and Harry N. Abram, Inc.
- Jones, Jonathan. "Madonna With Child and Two Angels, Filippo Lippi". The Guardian.
- Nygren, Barnaby (Fall 2008). "A FRIEND OF THE GROOM OR A LOVER OF THE BRIDE?: THE CUCKOLDING ANGEL IN FILIPPO LIPPI'S "UFFIZI MADONNA"". Notes in the History of Art. 28 (1). JSTOR 23207967.
- Nygren, Barnaby. "Una cosa che non e': Perspective and Humour in the Paintings of Flippo Lippi". Oxford Art.
- "Madonna with Child and two Angels by Filippo Lippi".
- Strutt, Edward (1901). Fra Filippo Lippi. London: George Bell and Sons.
