= Madonna del Prato (Bellini) =

Painting by Giovanni Bellini

Madonna of the Meadow
- Madonna del Prato (Italian)
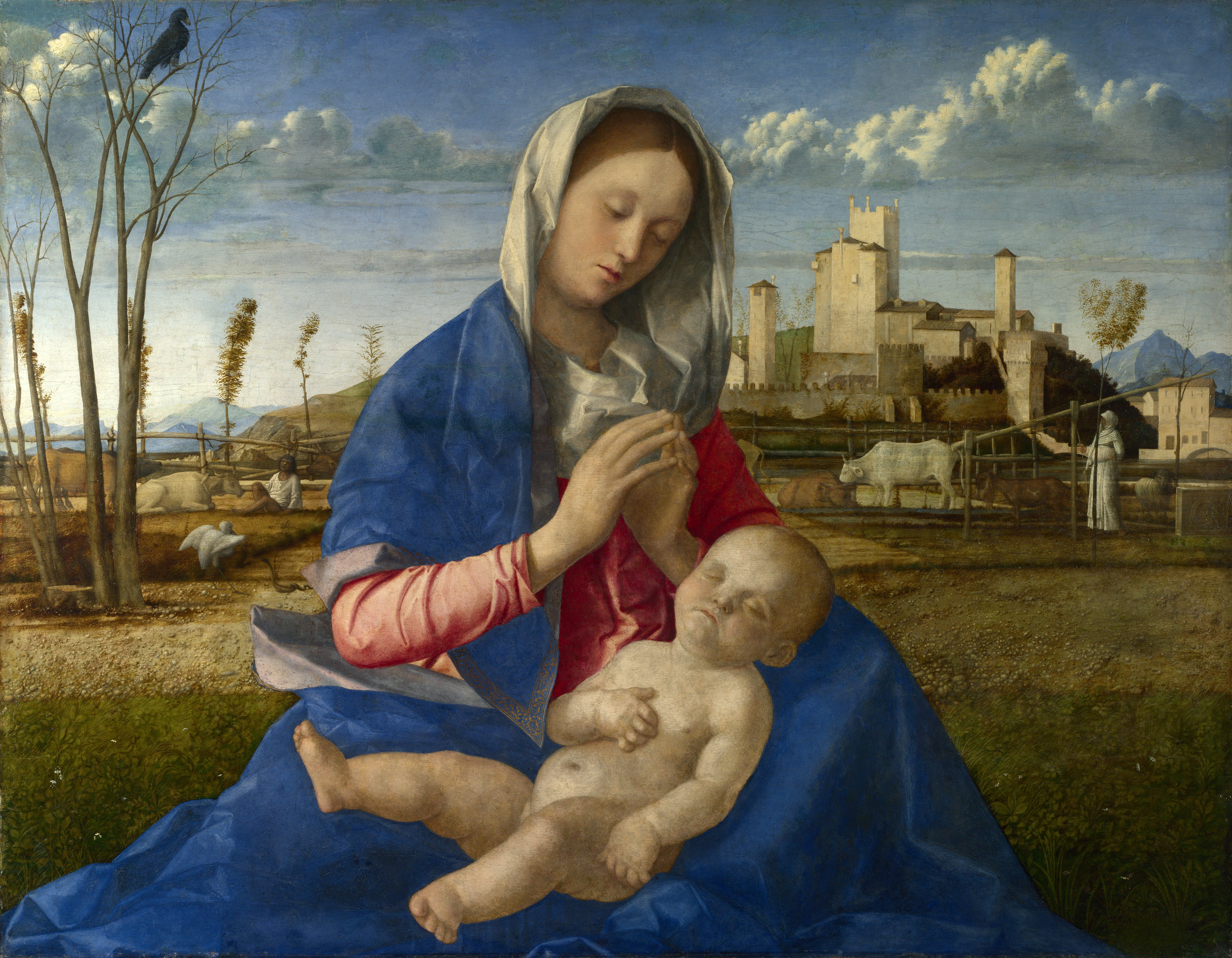
- Artist: Giovanni Bellini
- Year: 1505
- Type: Oil and tempera on panel
- Dimensions: 67.3 cm × 86.4 cm (26.5 in × 34.0 in)
- Location: National Gallery, London

Madonna del Prato (Madonna of the Meadow) is a 1505 painting of the Virgin Mary and the Christ Child by the Italian Renaissance painter Giovanni Bellini, now in the National Gallery in London. Originally painted as oil and egg tempera on wood, it was transferred to canvas in 1949, with damage in places.

It presents a medieval iconography of the Virgin of humility seated before a full and shining rural panorama, with both the devotional aspect and the landscape aspect given equal prominence. Full of small details of everyday life, this landscape contributes to the intimate and familiar tone of the two figures. The raven in the tree possibly symbolises death. The figures' poses invite meditation on Jesus's death and passion, recalling Pietà compositions with the dead adult Jesus in his mother's lap.

== See also ==
- List of works by Giovanni Bellini
