= Virgin and Child (Cima, London, c. 1496–1499) =

Painting by Cima da Conegliano

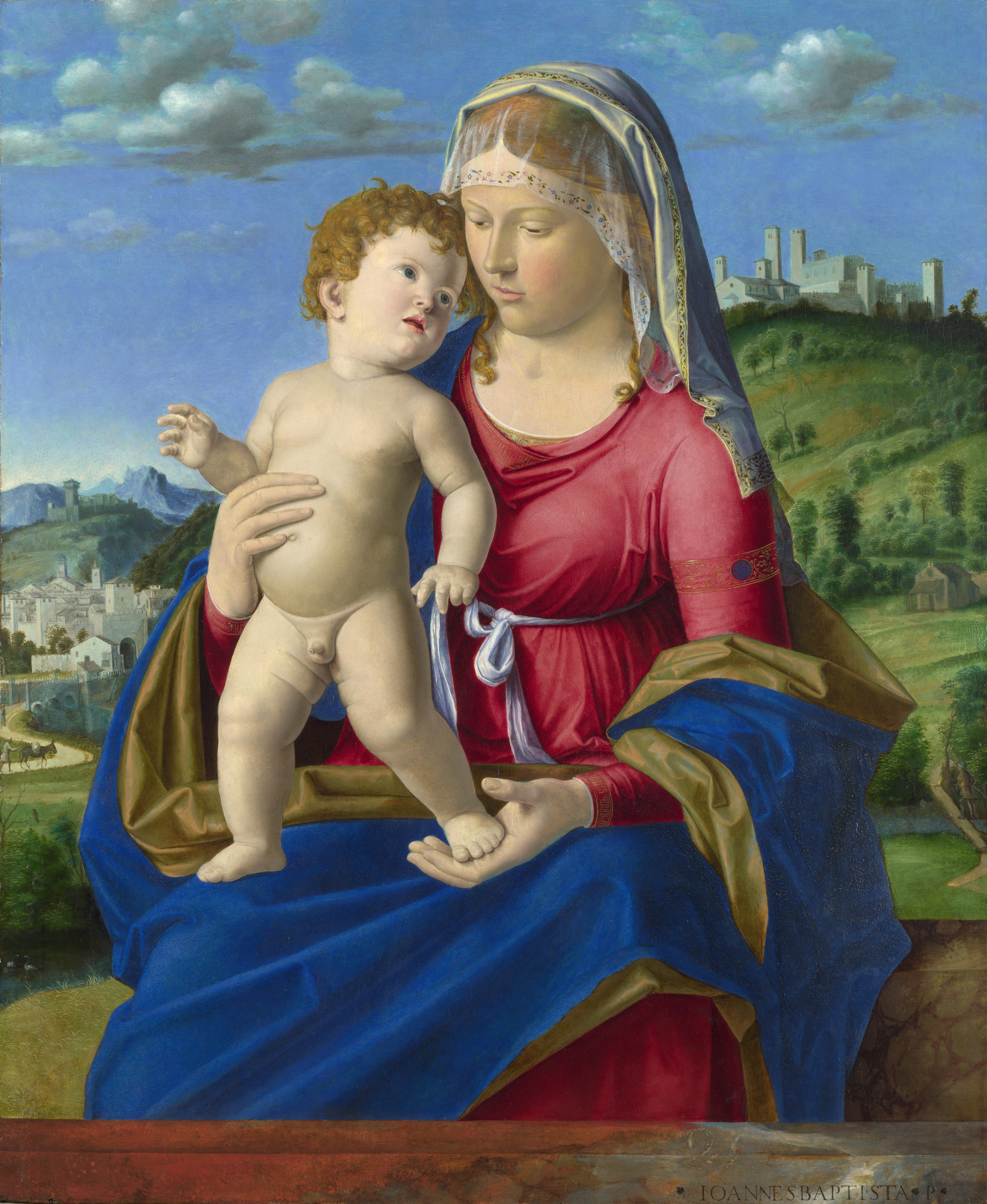
The Virgin and the Child (1496–1499) by Cima da Conegliano

The Virgin and Child is a 1496–1499 oil on panel painting by Cima da Conegliano, bought in 1858 by the National Gallery, London, where it still hangs.

== Variants ==
The painter usually produced unique compositions, but this work belongs to a group of at least five he produced from a single cartoon:

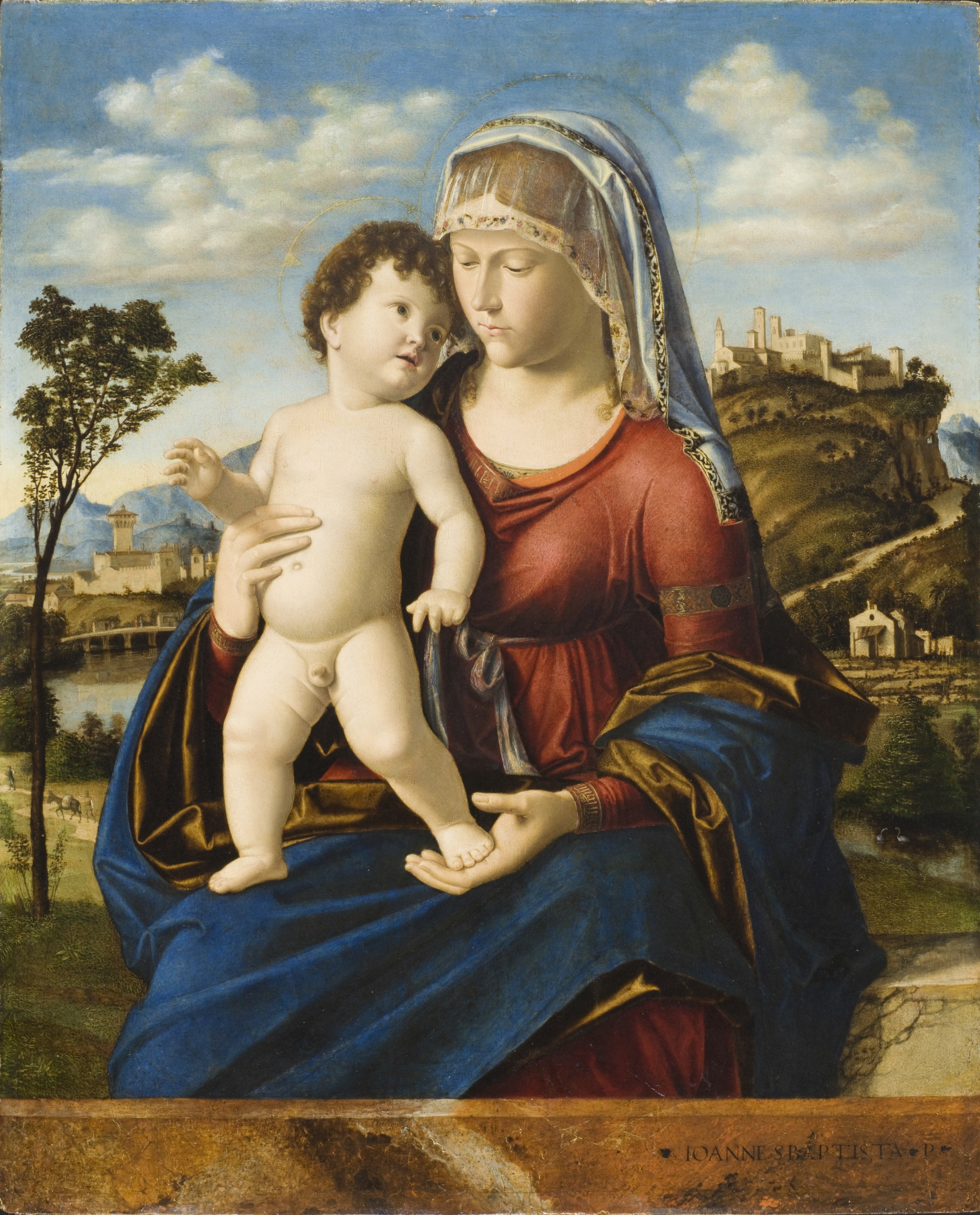
LCMA

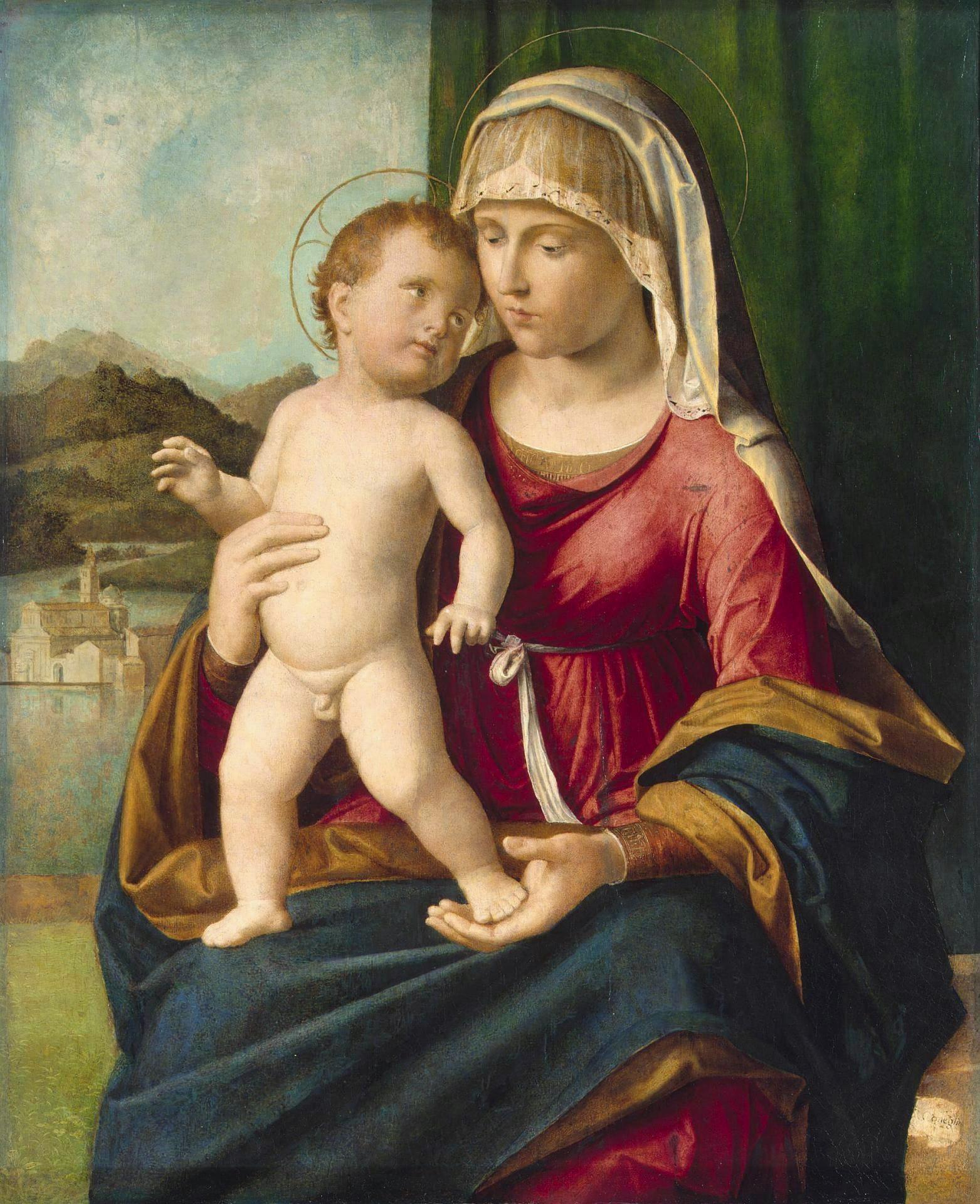
Hermitage

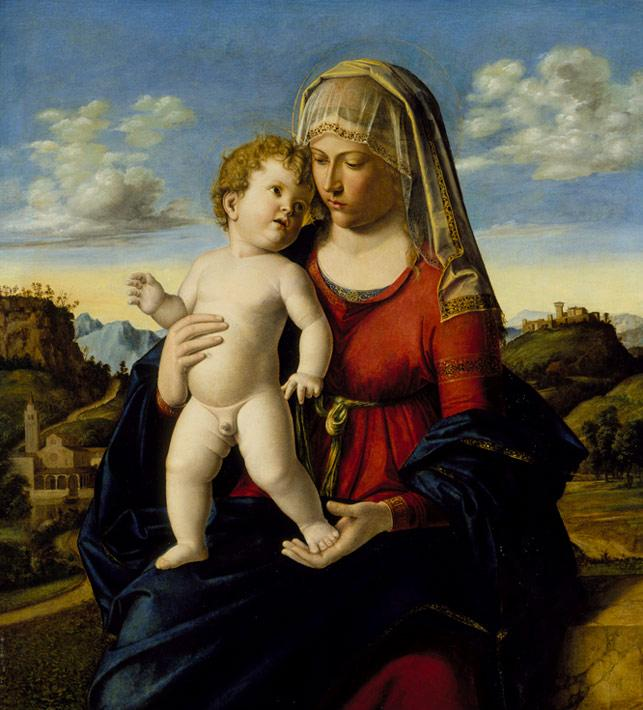
NCMA

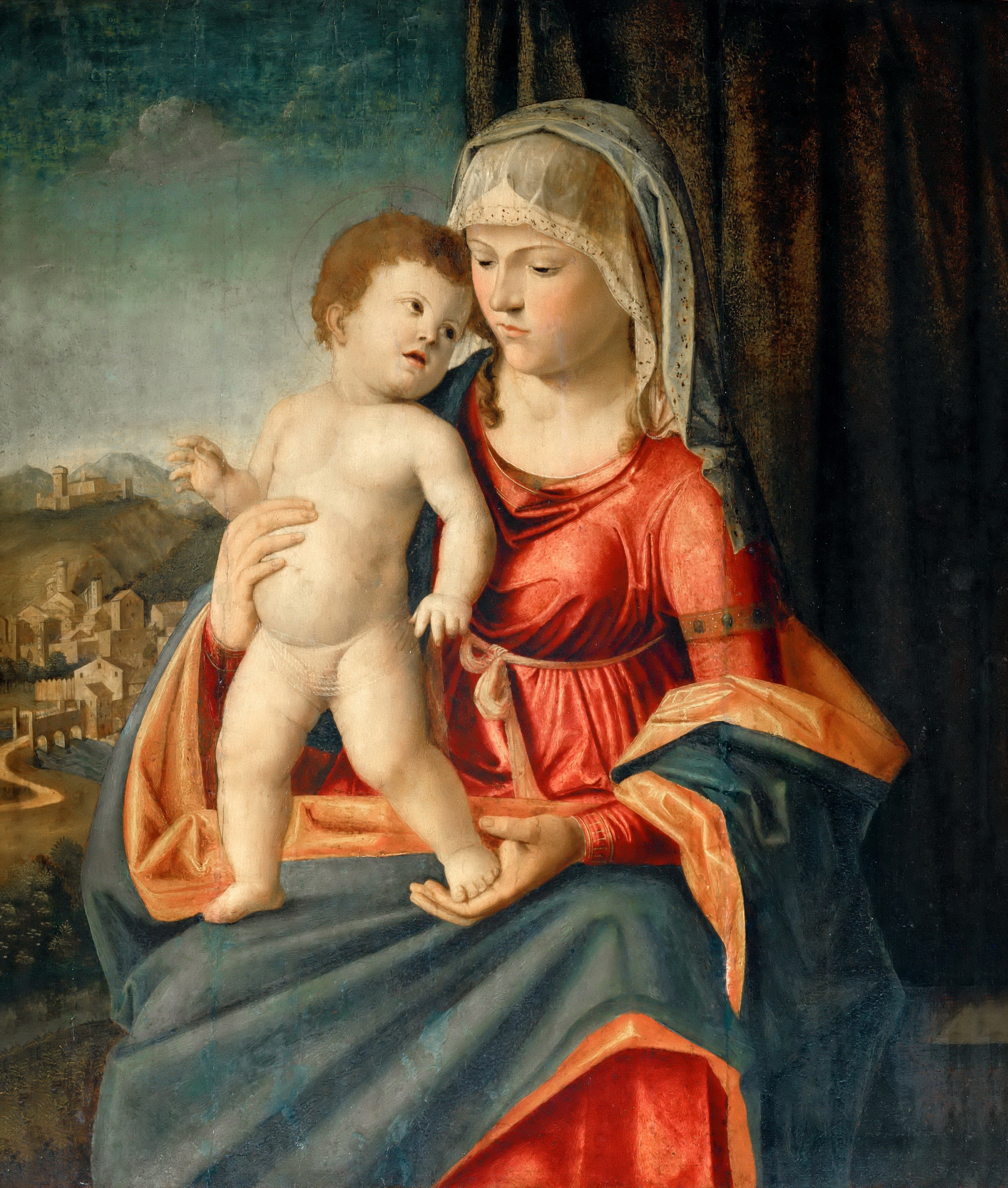
Louvre
