= Madonna and Child in a Landscape (Cima, Los Angeles) =

Painting by Cima da Conegliano

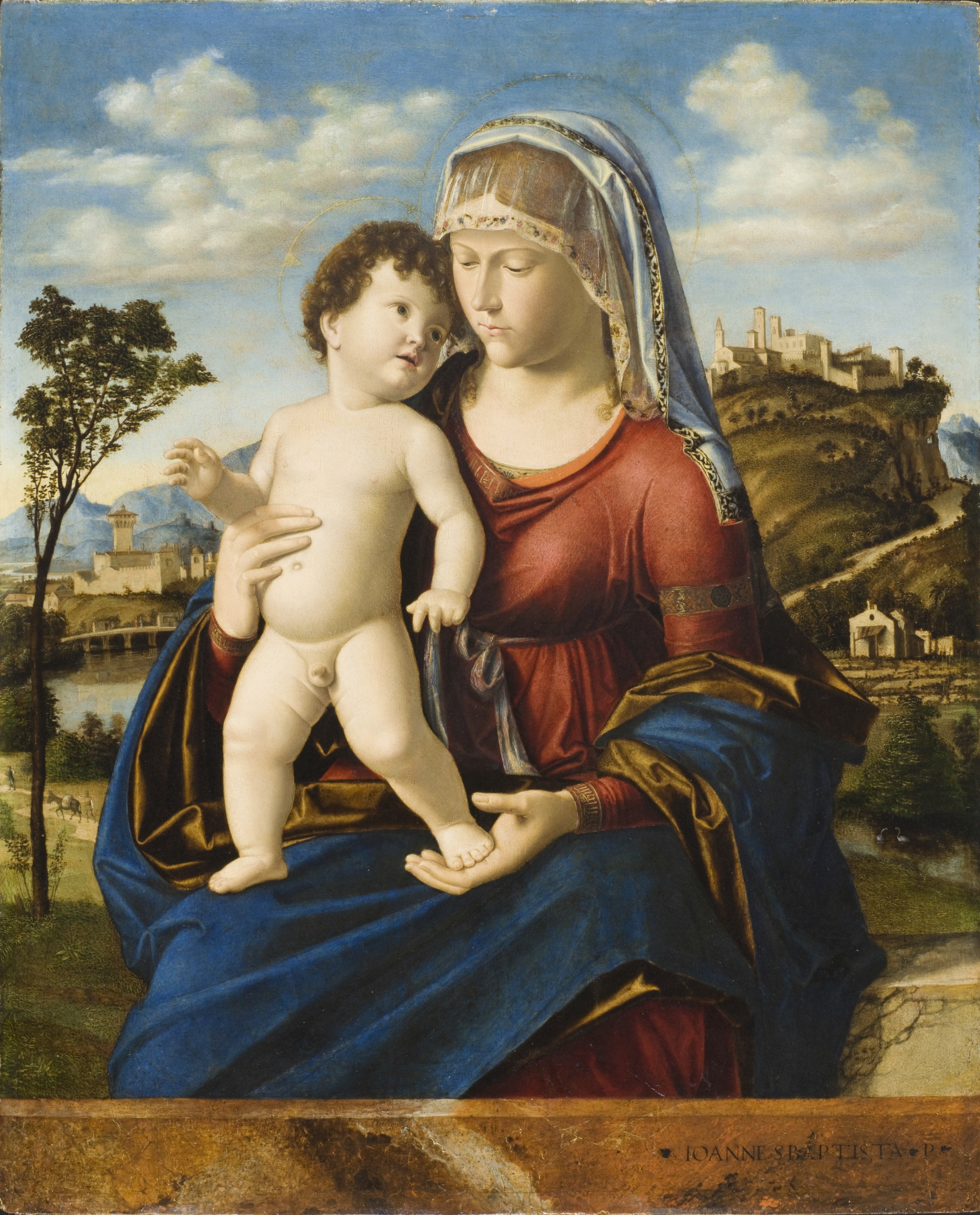
Madonna and Child (1496–1499) by Cima da Conegliano

Madonna and Child is a 1496–1499 oil on panel painting by Cima da Conegliano, now in the Los Angeles County Museum of Art.

== Variants ==
Unusually for the artist, who usually produced unique works, this one seems to belong to a group of at least five works produced from a single cartoon.

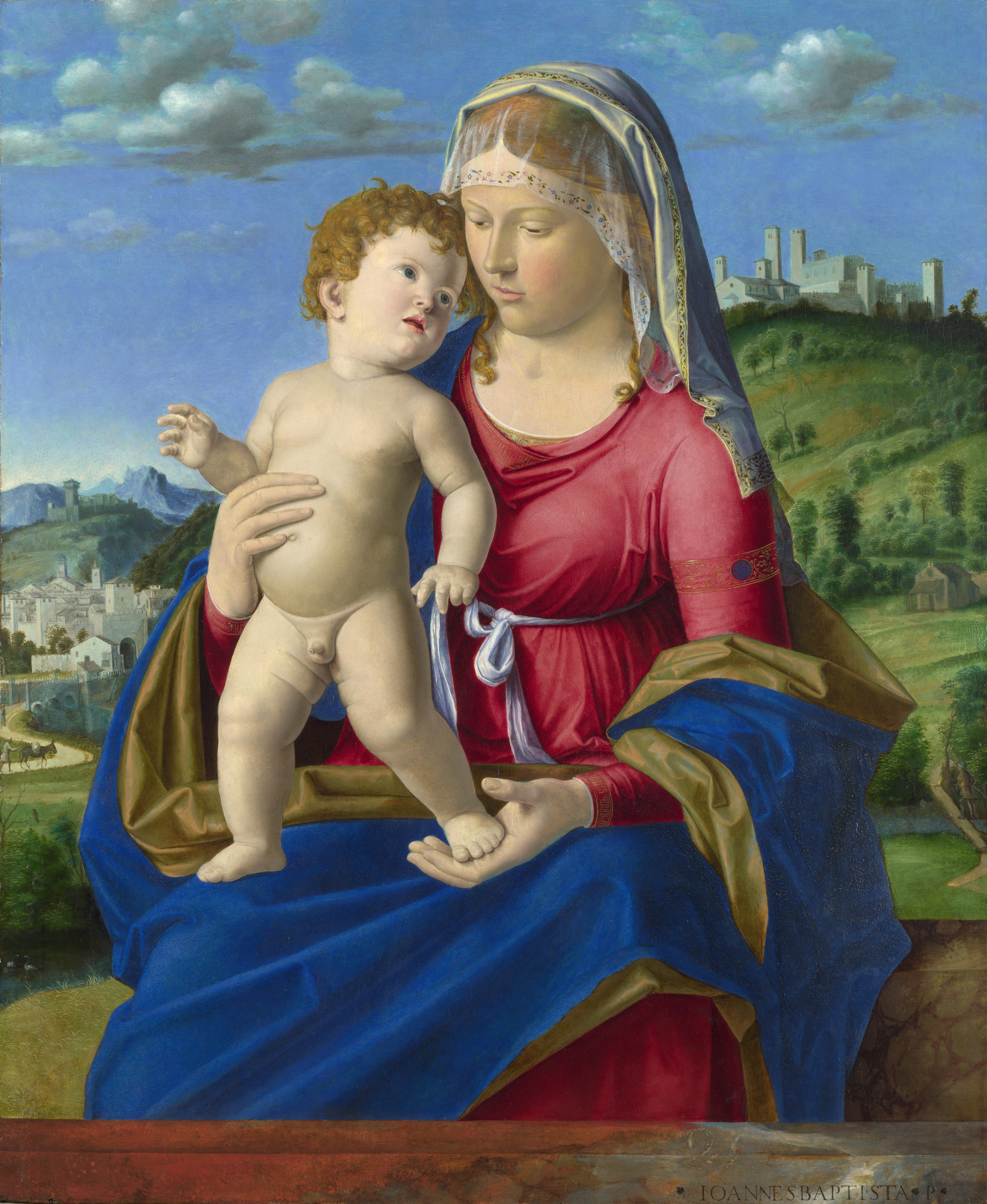
National Gallery

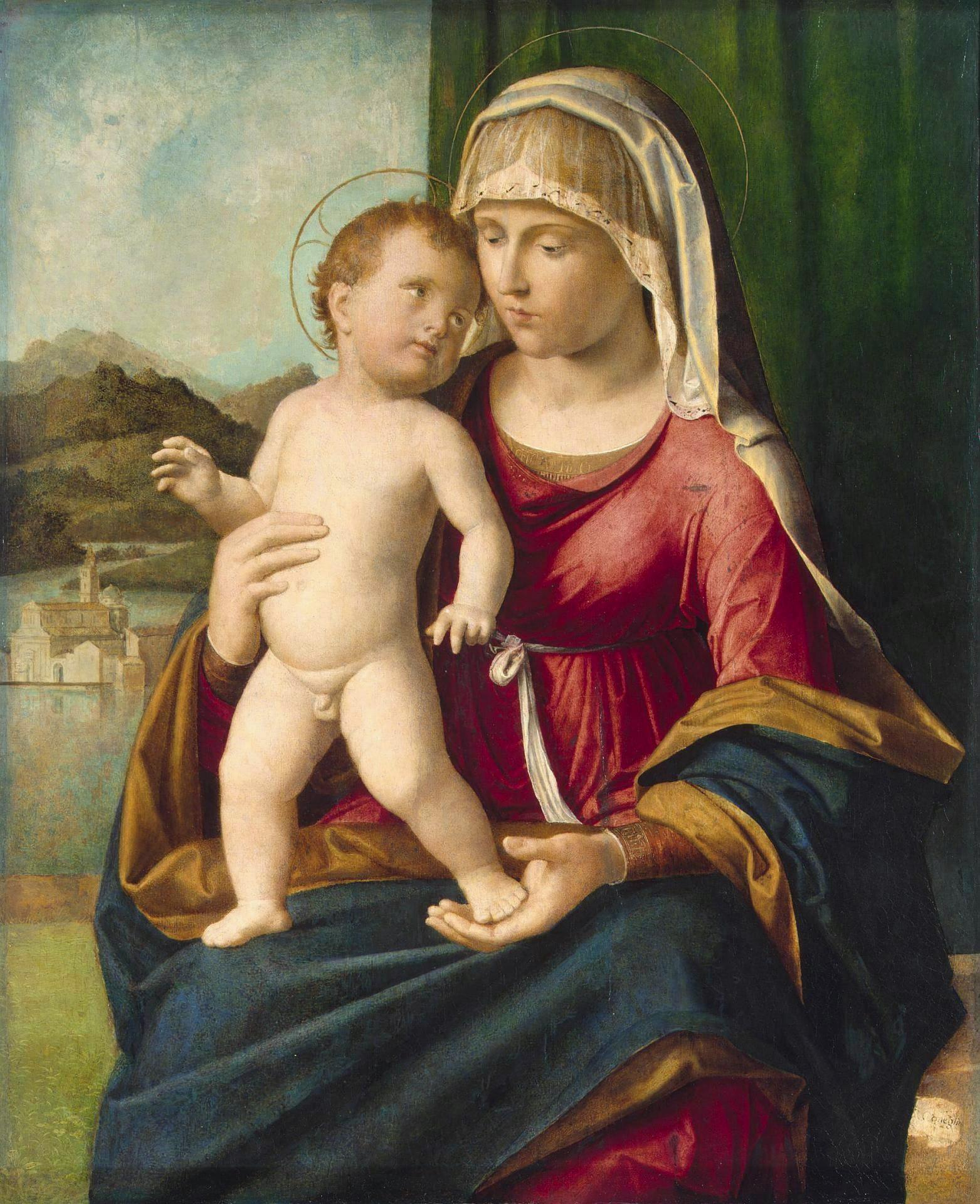
Hermitage

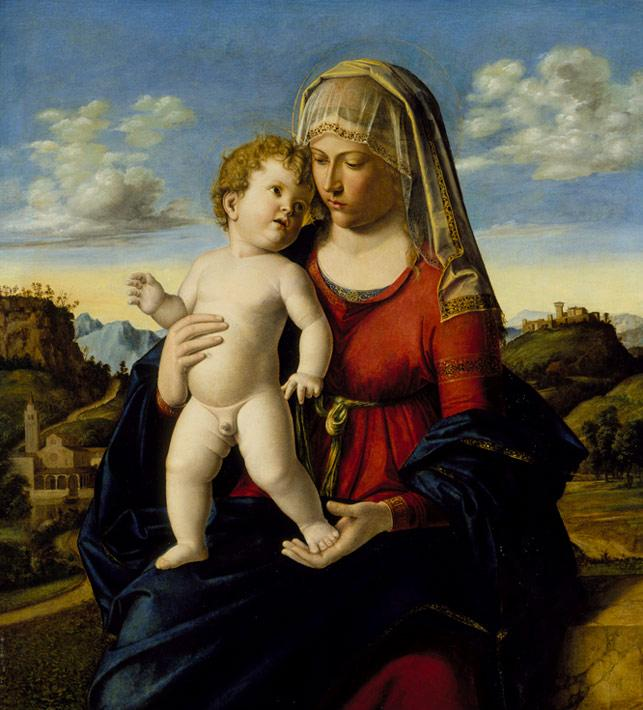
NCMA

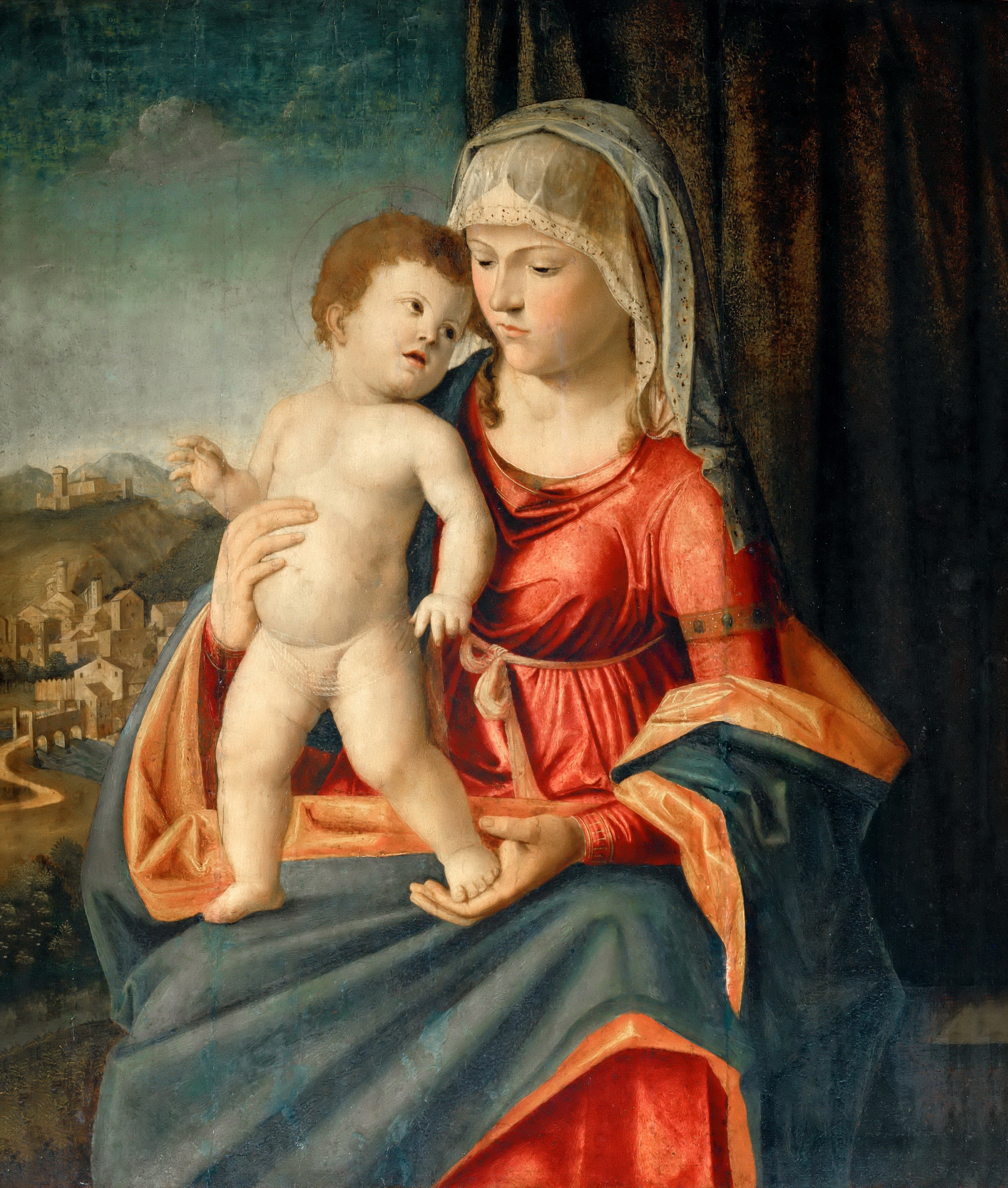
Louvre
