= Madonna and Child (workshop of Cima, Paris) =

Painting by the workshop of Cima da Conegliano

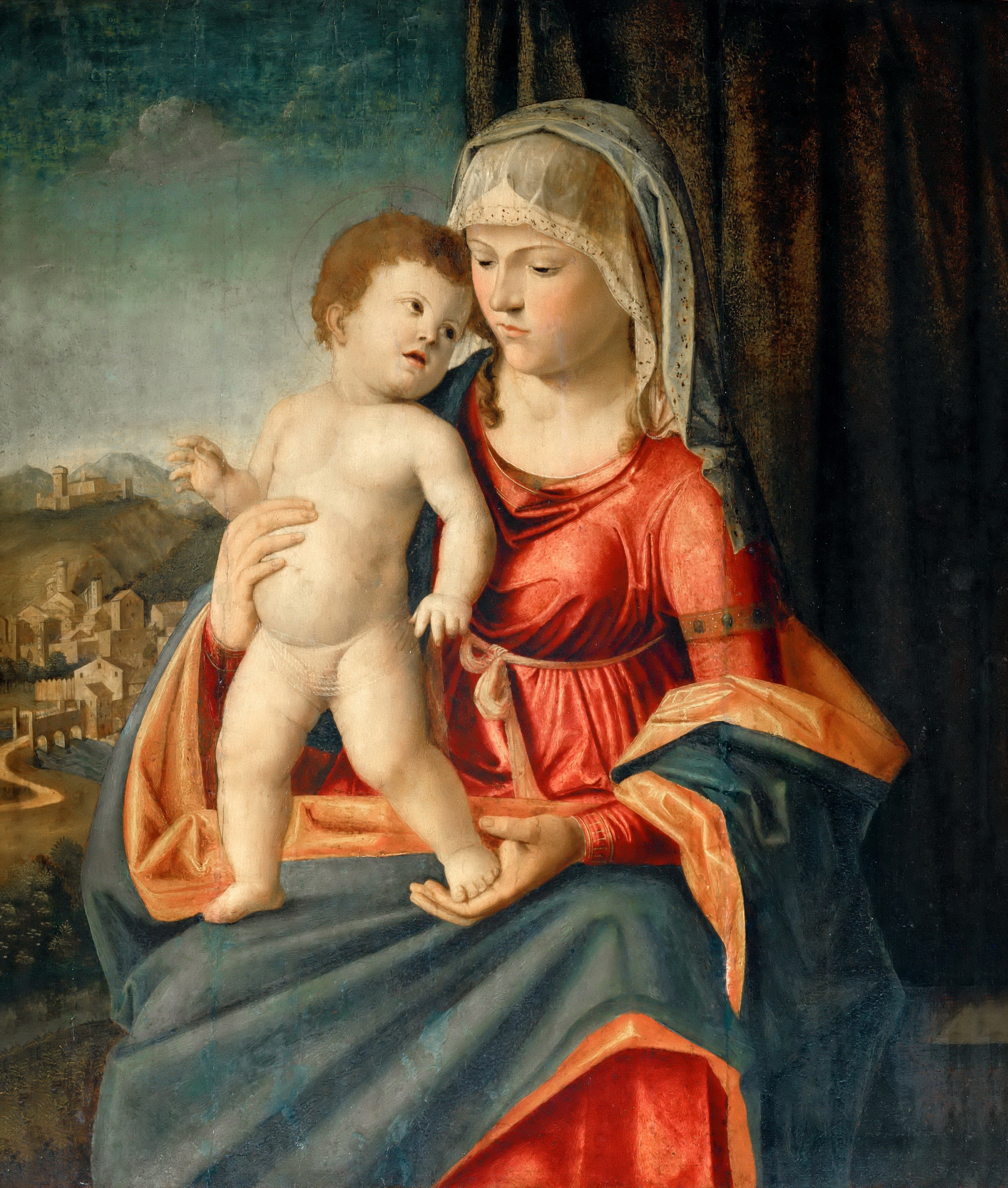
Madonna and Child (1504–1507) by Cima da Conegliano

Madonna and Child is a 1504–1507 oil on panel painting by Cima da Conegliano, now in the Louvre, in Paris.

== Variants ==
The artist usually produced unique compositions, but this work belongs to a group of at least five paintings produced from the same cartoon:

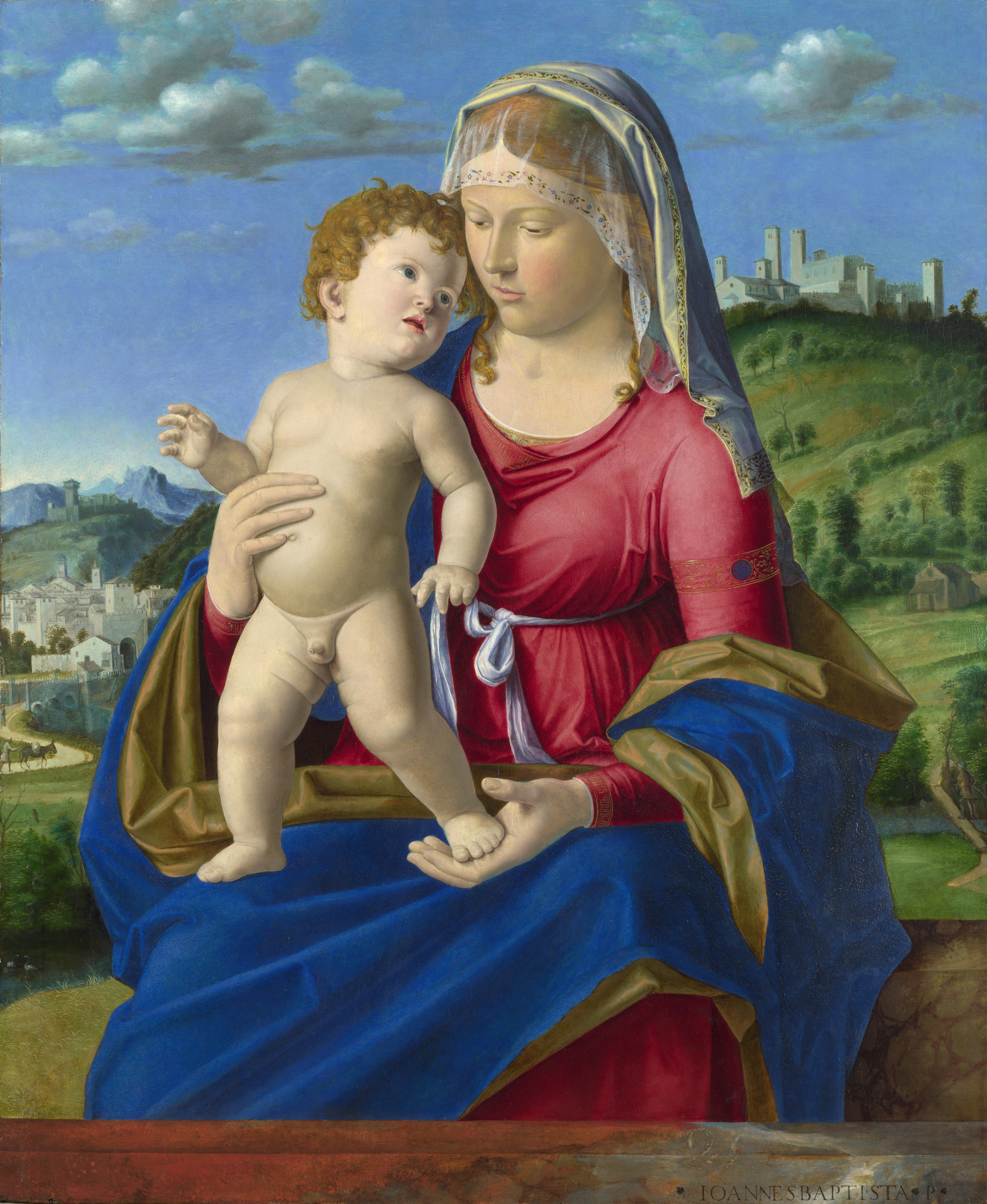
London

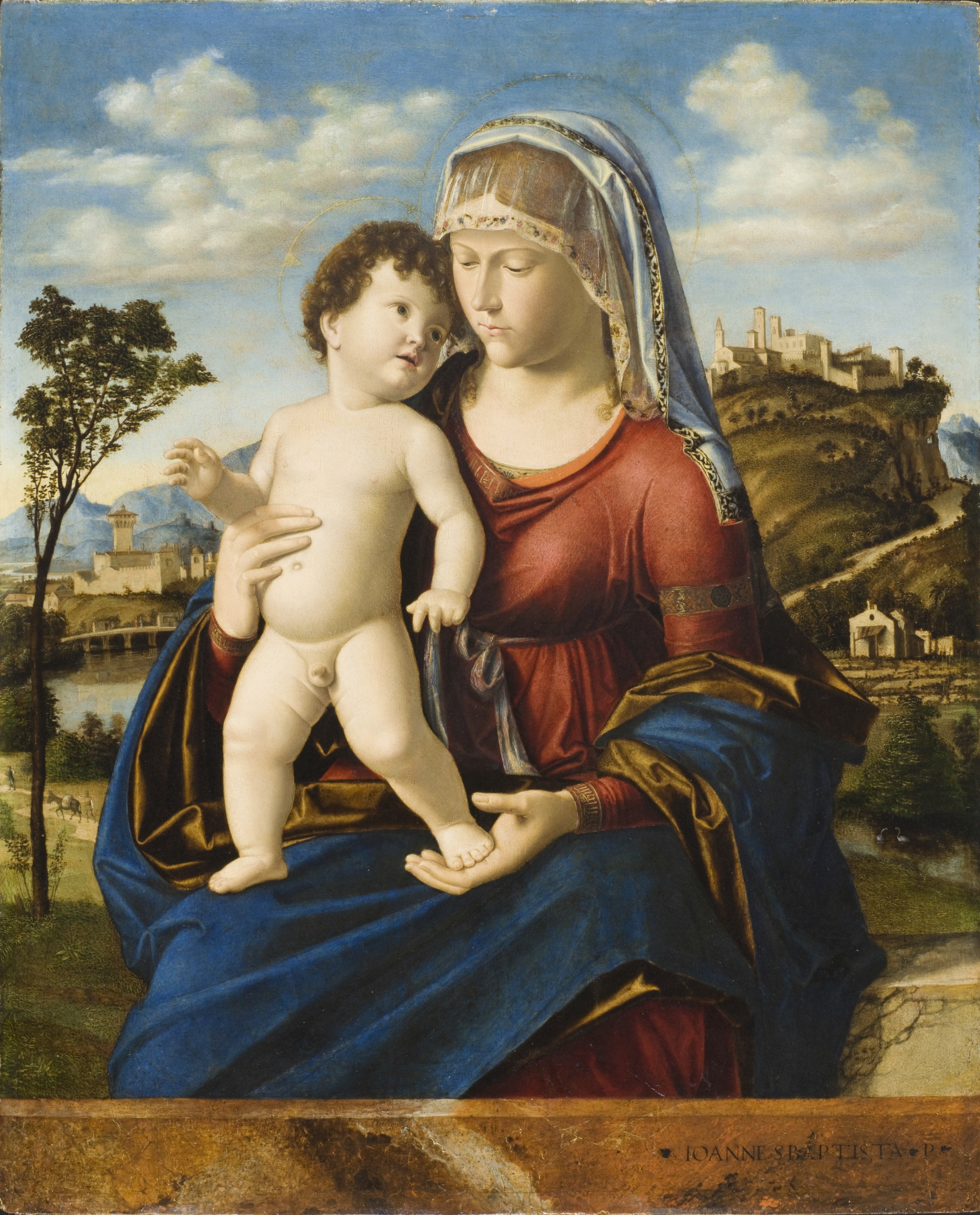
LACMA

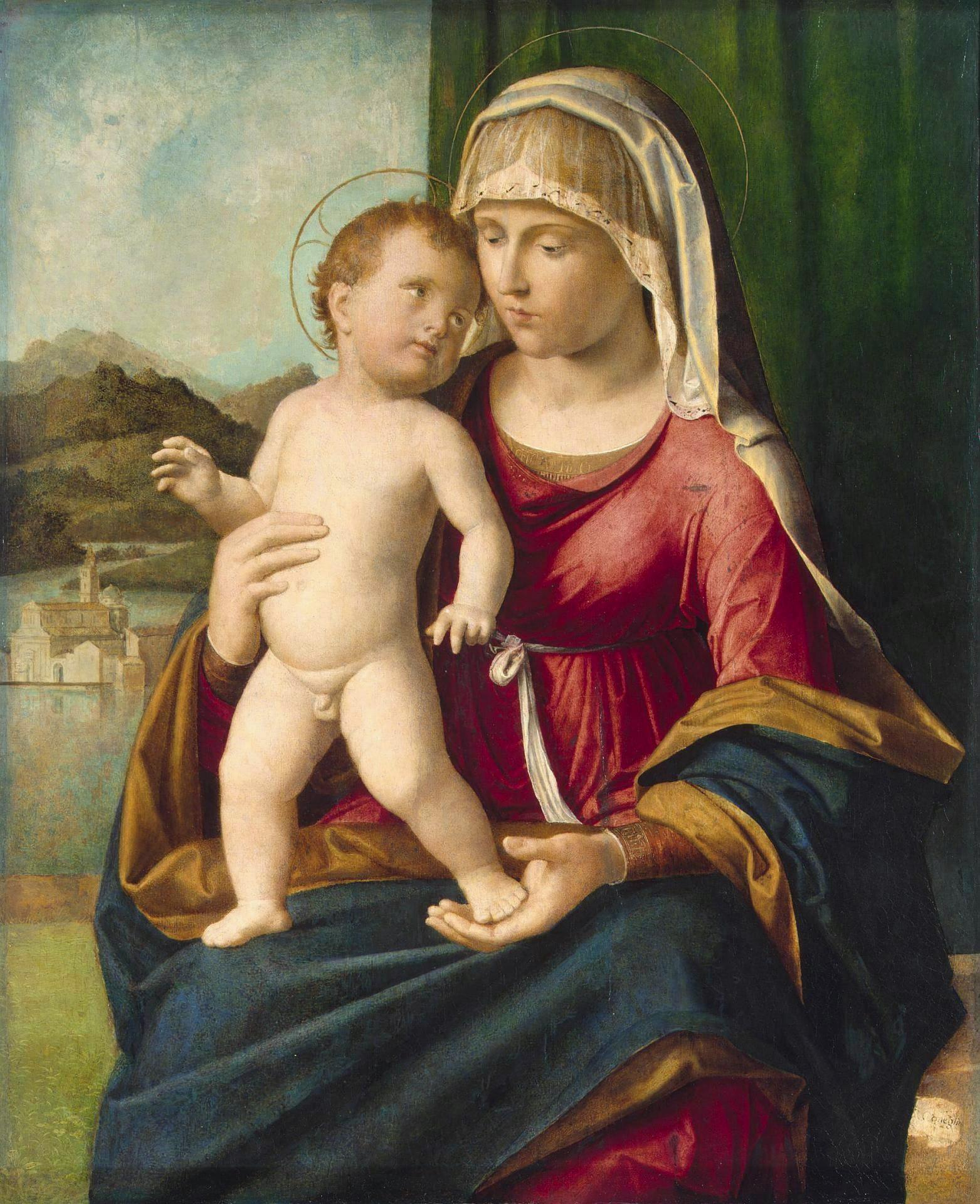
Hermitage

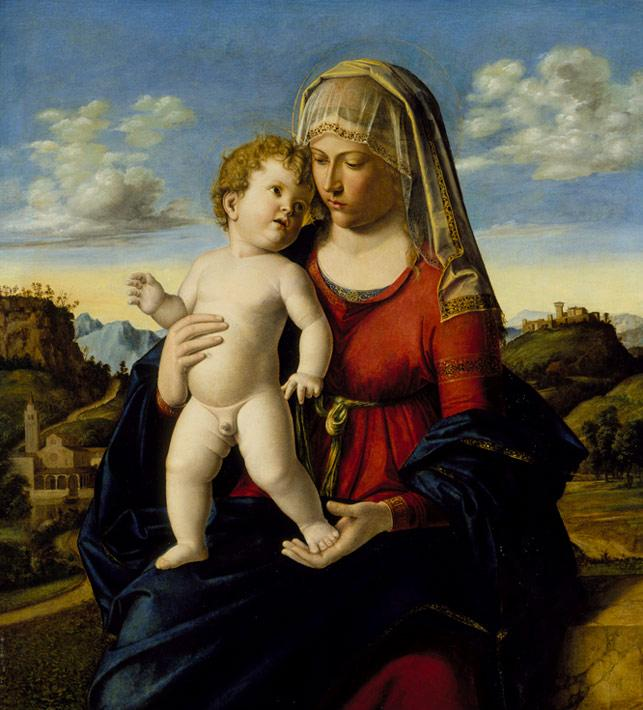
NCMA
