= Madonna and Child (Cima, Saint Petersburg) =

Painting by Cima da Conegliano

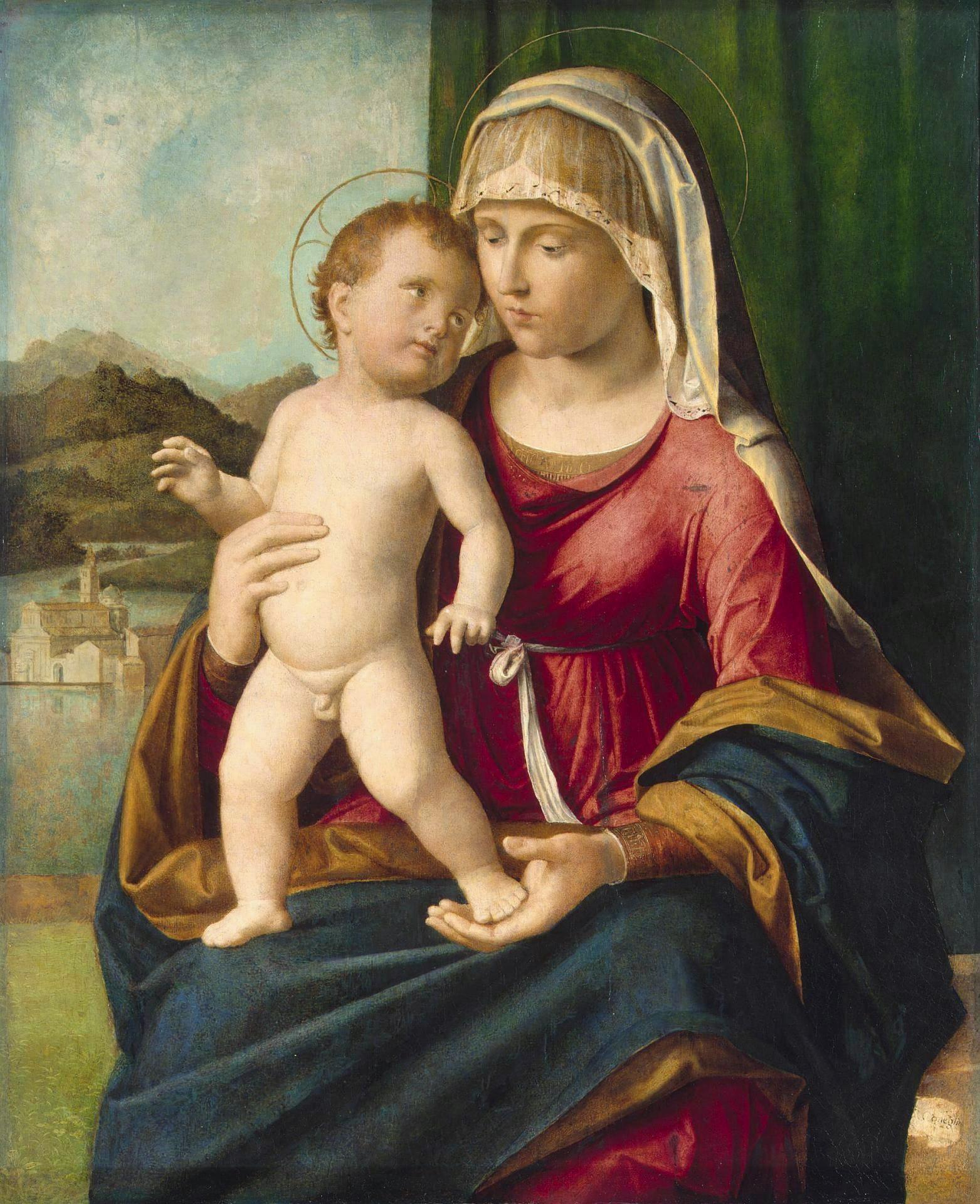
- Artist: Cima da Conegliano
- Year: 1496–1499
- Medium: Oil on canvas
- Dimensions: 65 cm × 53 cm (26 in × 21 in)
- Location: Hermitage Museum, Saint Petersburg

Madonna and Child is a painting in oils on canvas of 1496–1499 by Cima da Conegliano. Previously in the L. M. and K. L. Kochubey collection, it was seized by the Soviet Union's State Museum Fund and in 1921 was handed to the Hermitage Museum in Saint Petersburg, where it still hangs.

== Variants ==
Unusually for the artist, who usually produced unique works, this one seems to belong to a group of at least five works produced from a single cartoon:

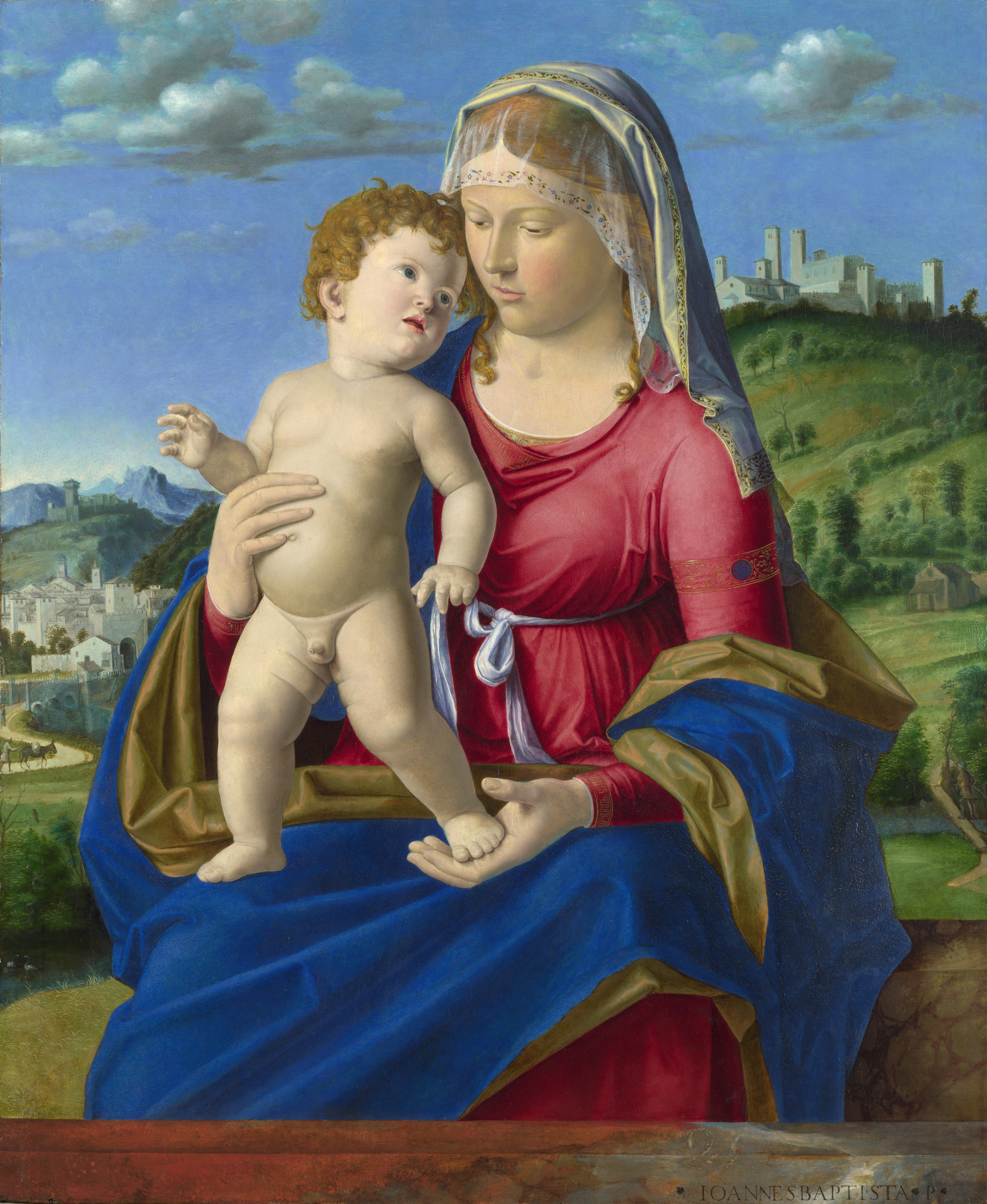
National Gallery

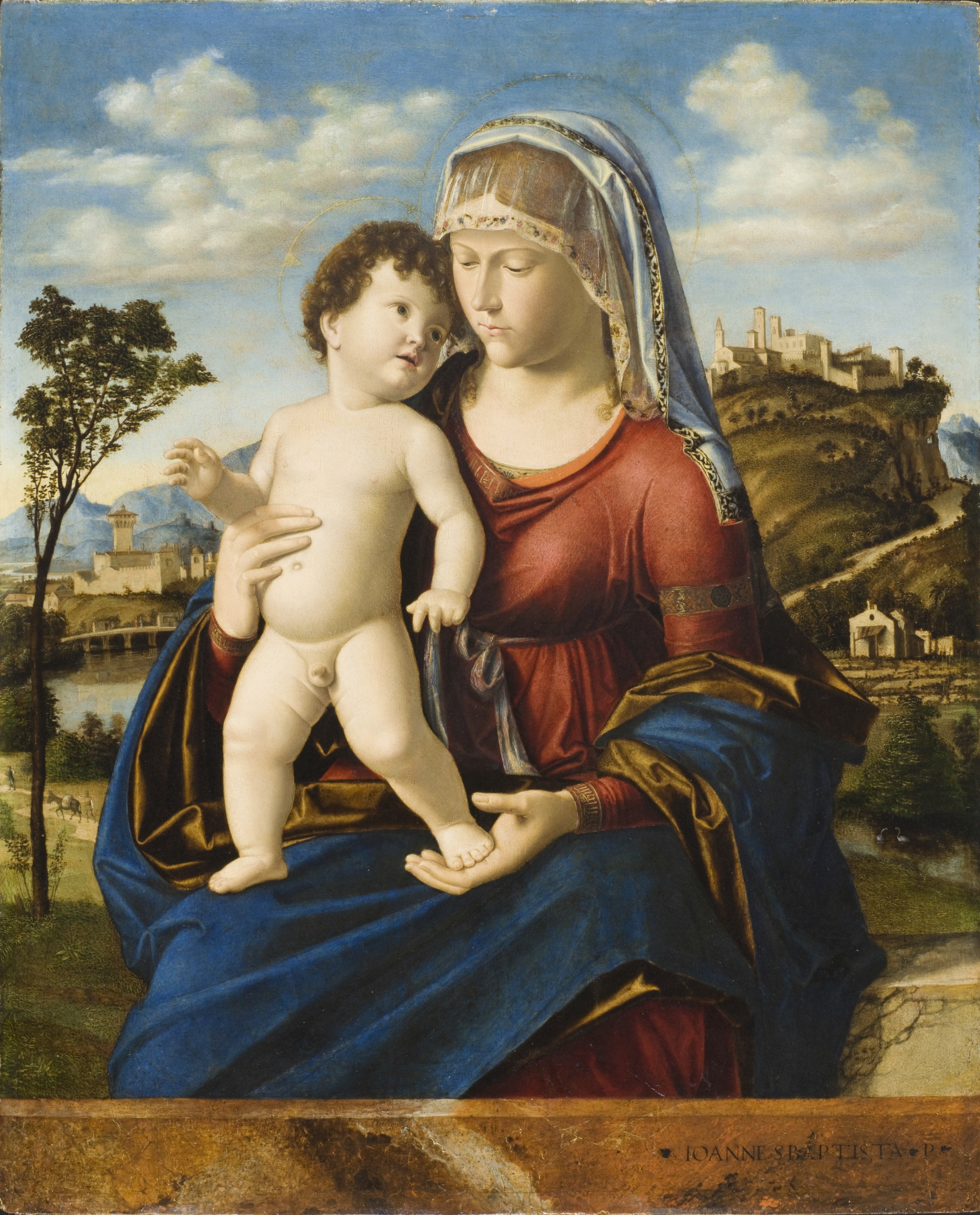
Los Angeles

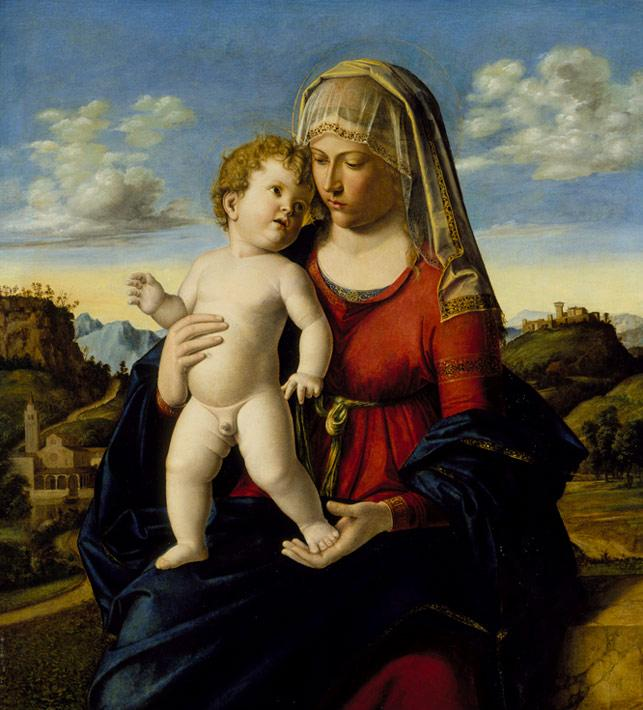
NCMA

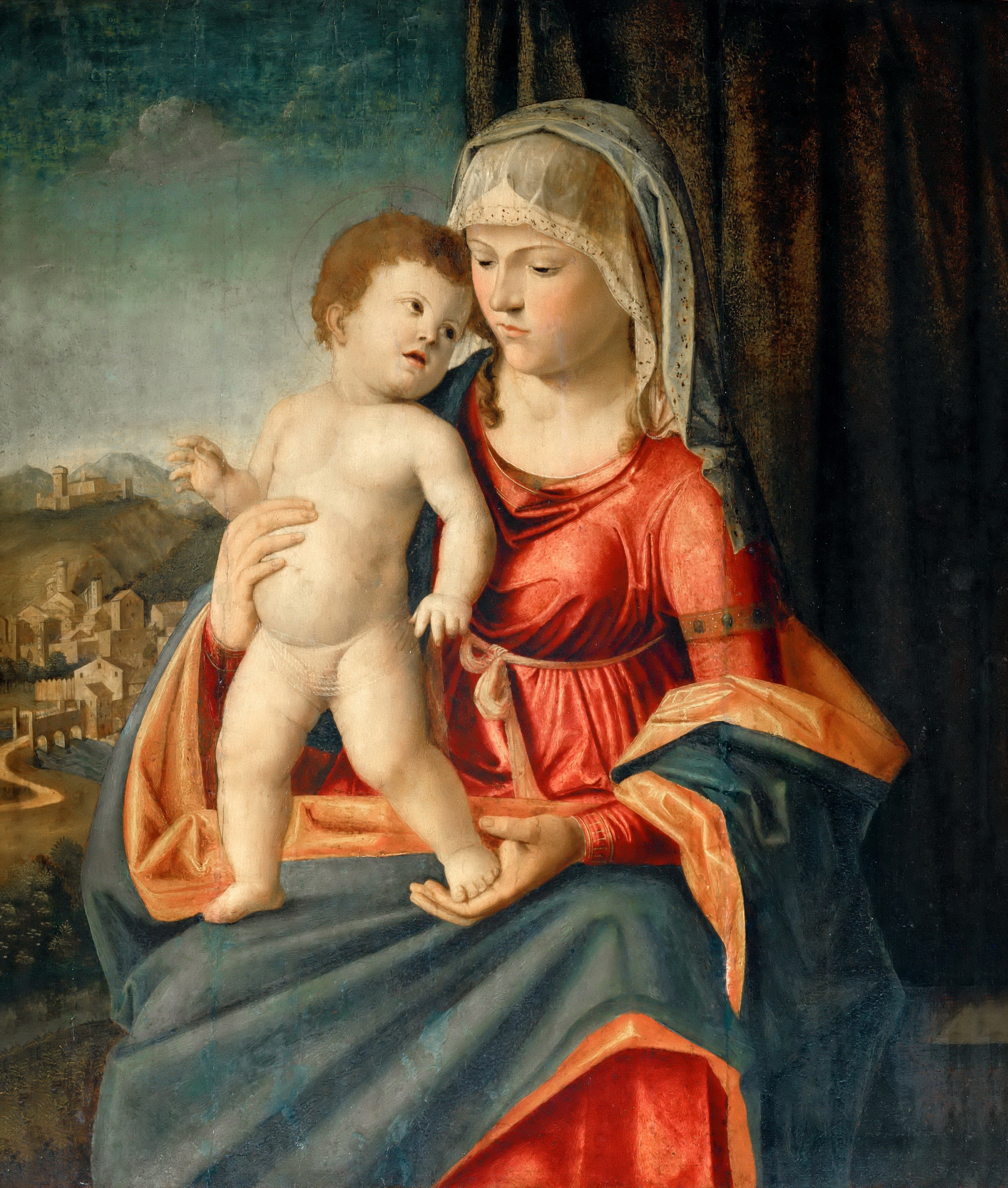
Louvre
