= Virgin and Child in a Landscape (Cima, Raleigh) =

Painting by Cima da Conegliano

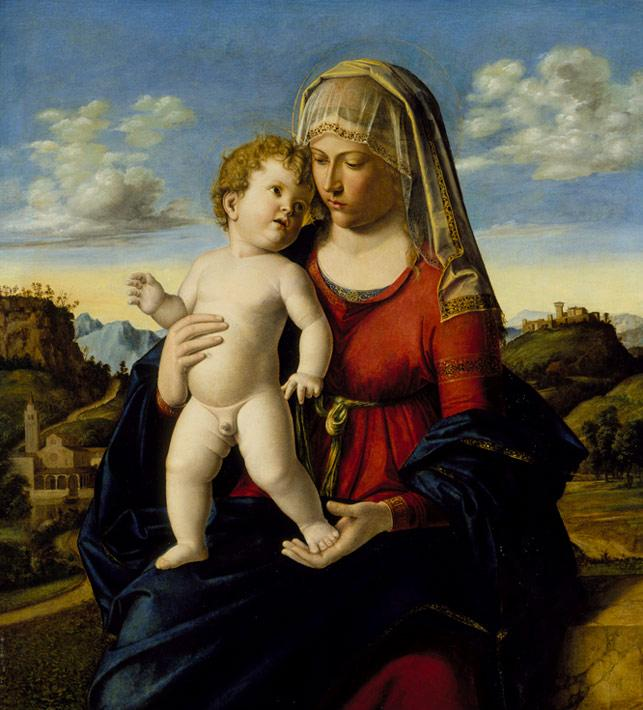
Virgin and Child in a Landscape (1496–1499) by Cima da Conegliano

Virgin and Child in a Landscape is a 1496–1499 oil on panel painting by Cima da Conegliano, now in the North Carolina Museum of Art, in Raleigh.

== Variants ==
The artist usually produced single compositions, but this work belongs to a group of at least five he produced from a single cartoon:

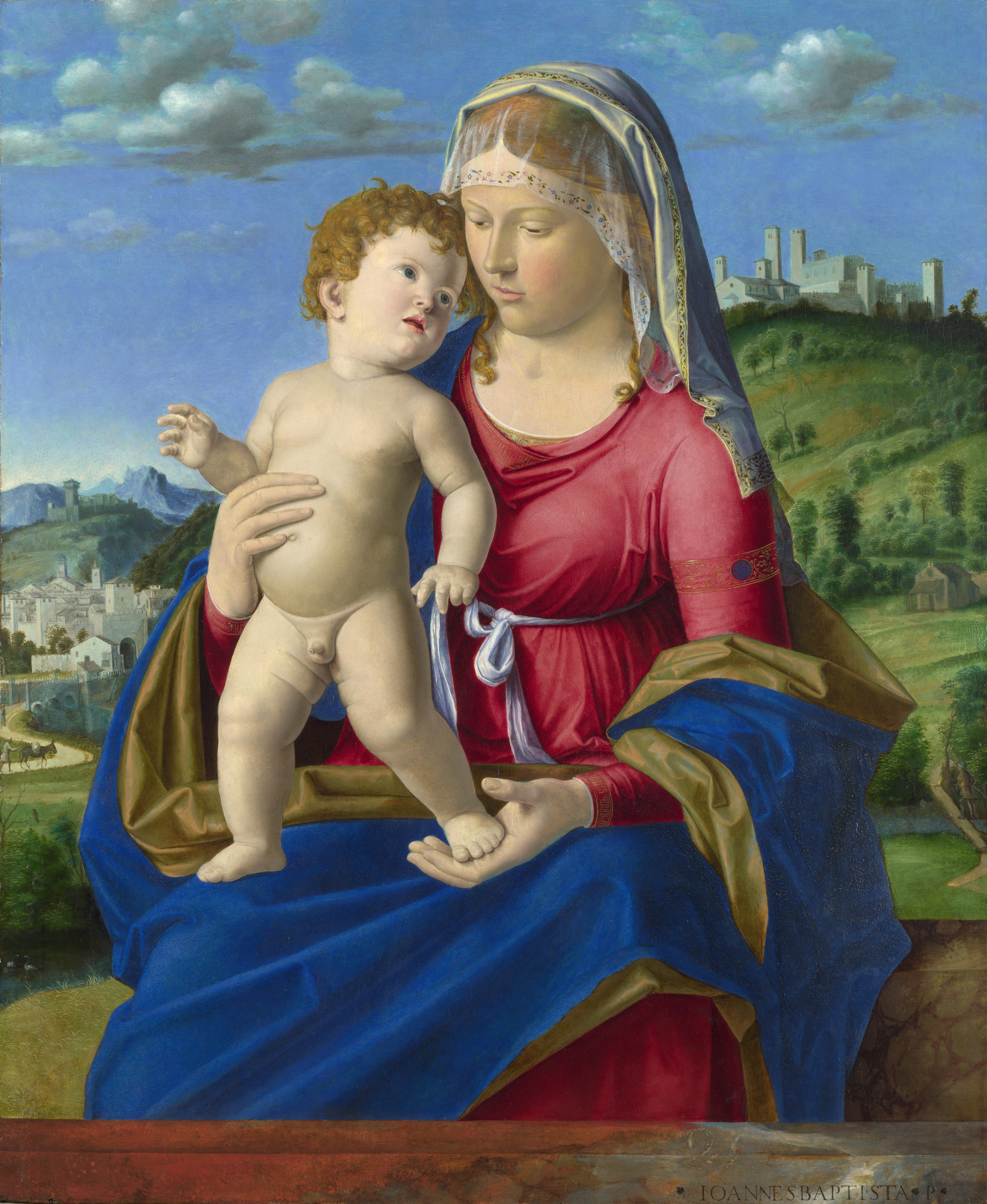
National Gallery

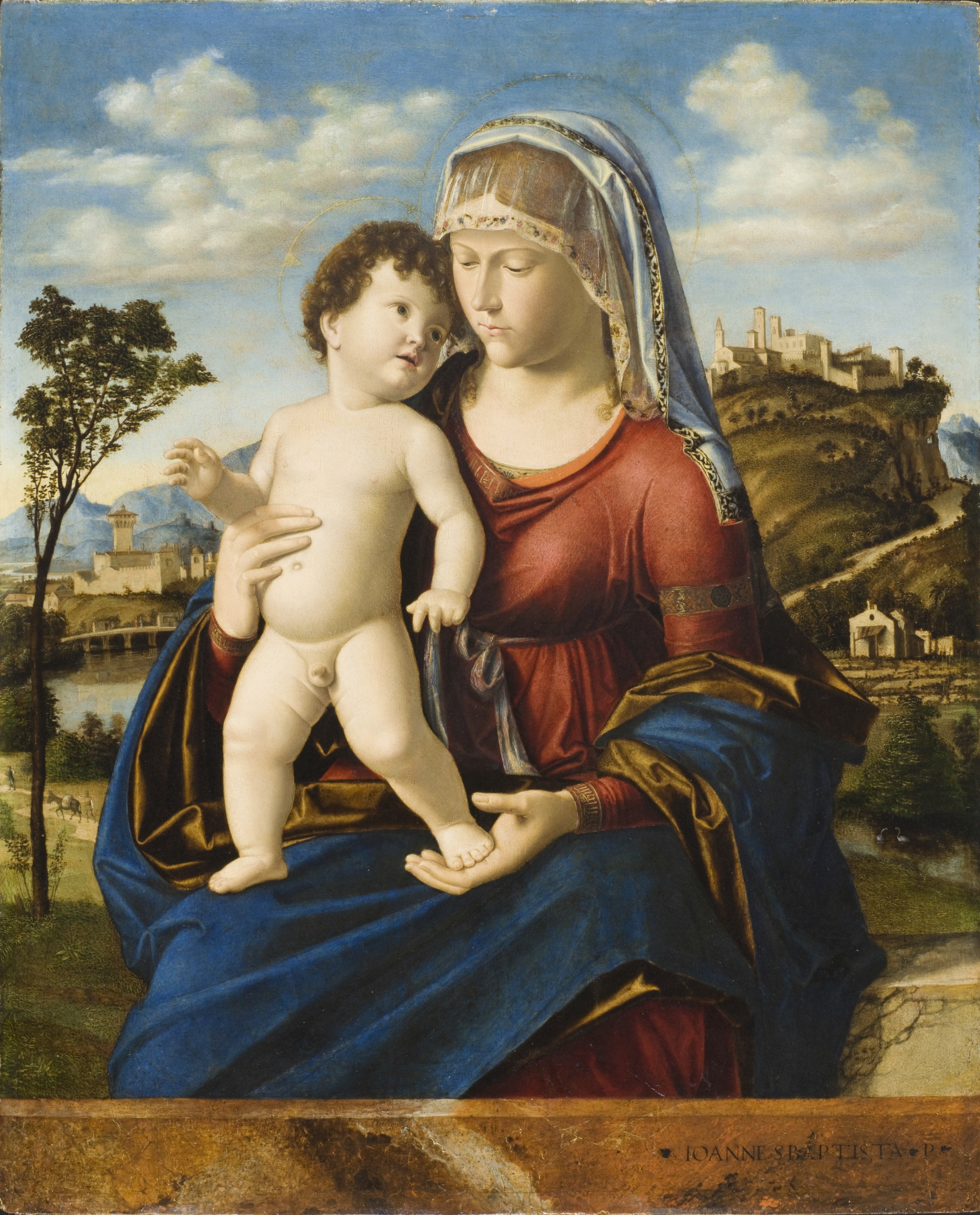
LCMA

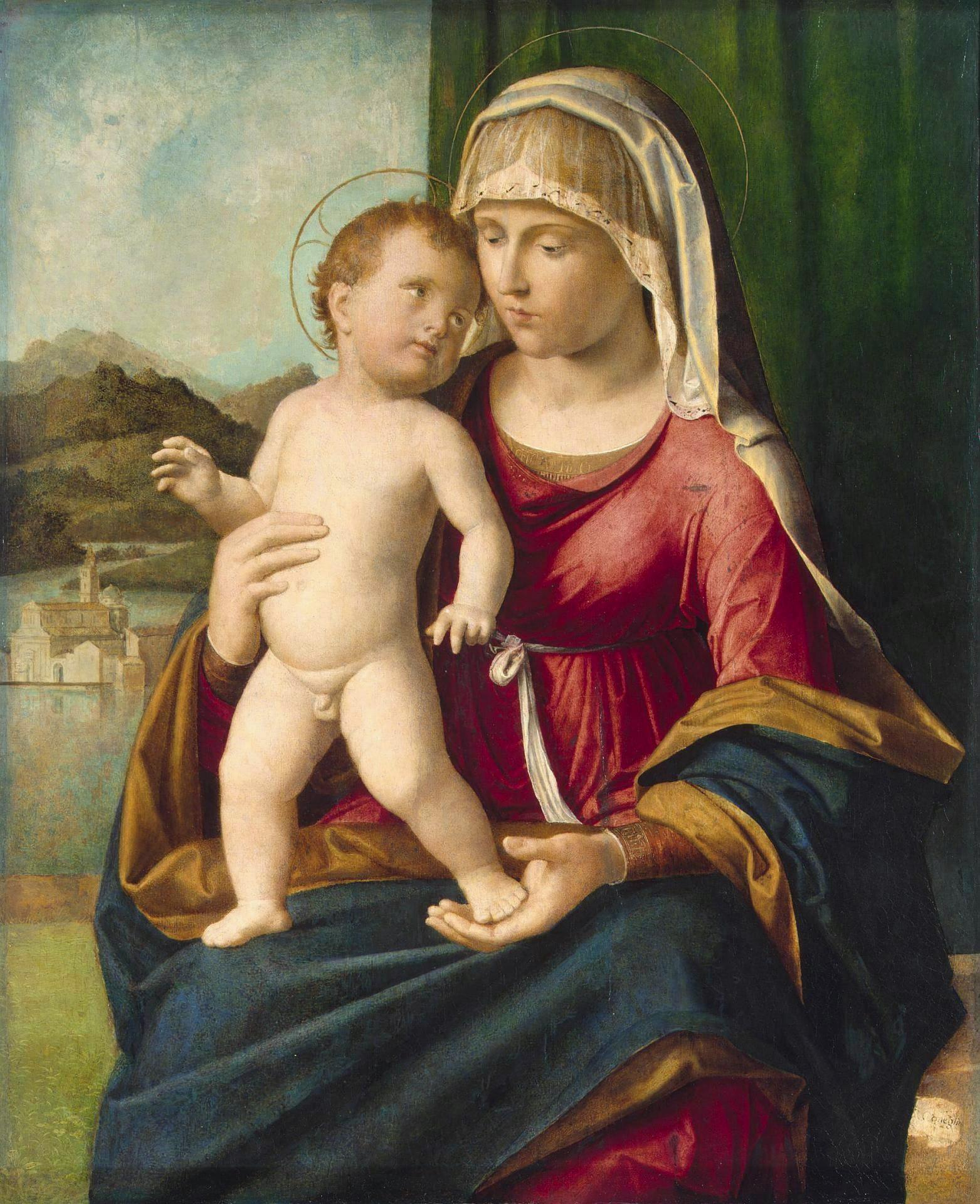
Hermitage

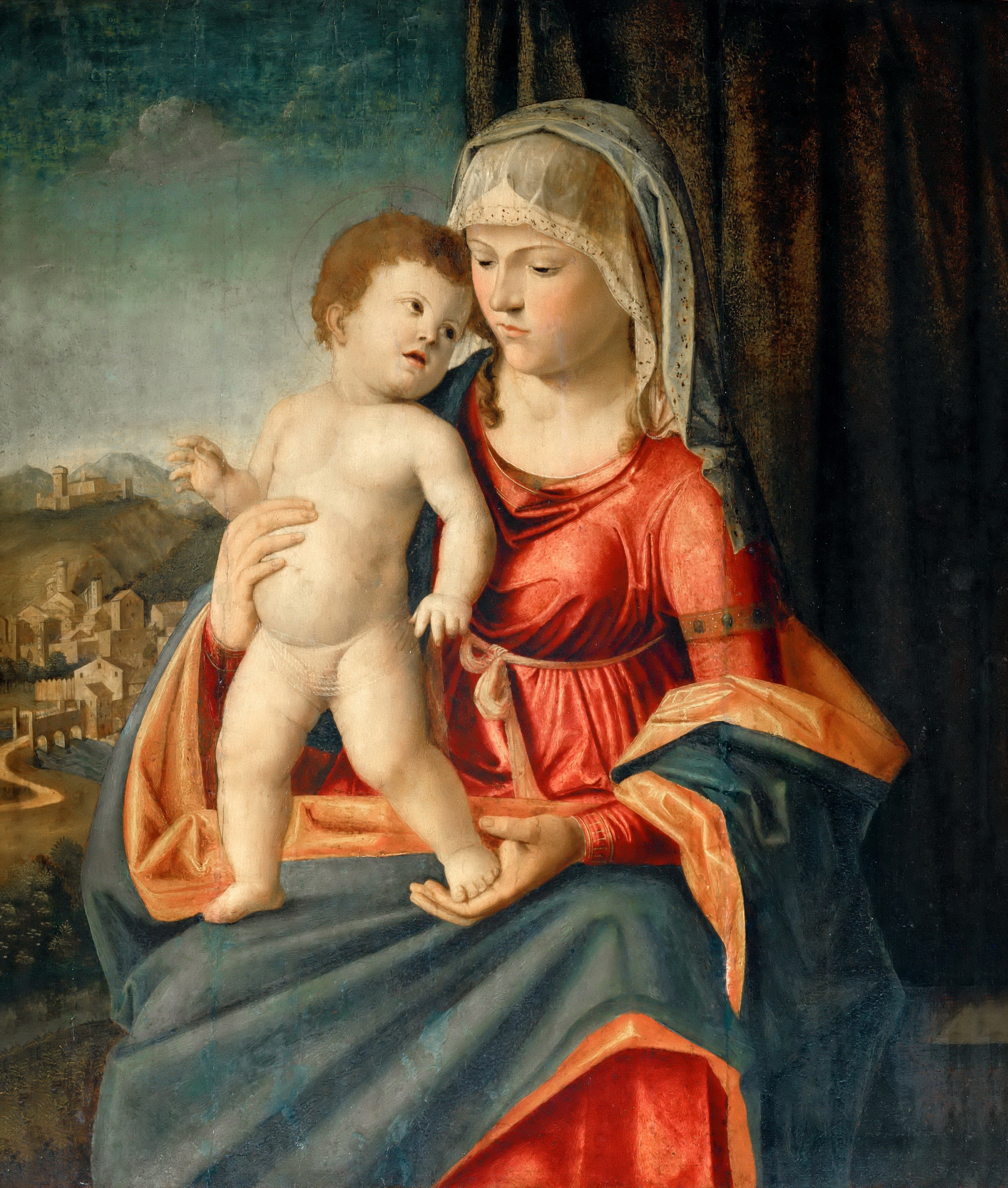
Paris
