= Virgin and Child (Cima, London, c. 1499–1502) =

Painting by Cima da Conegliano

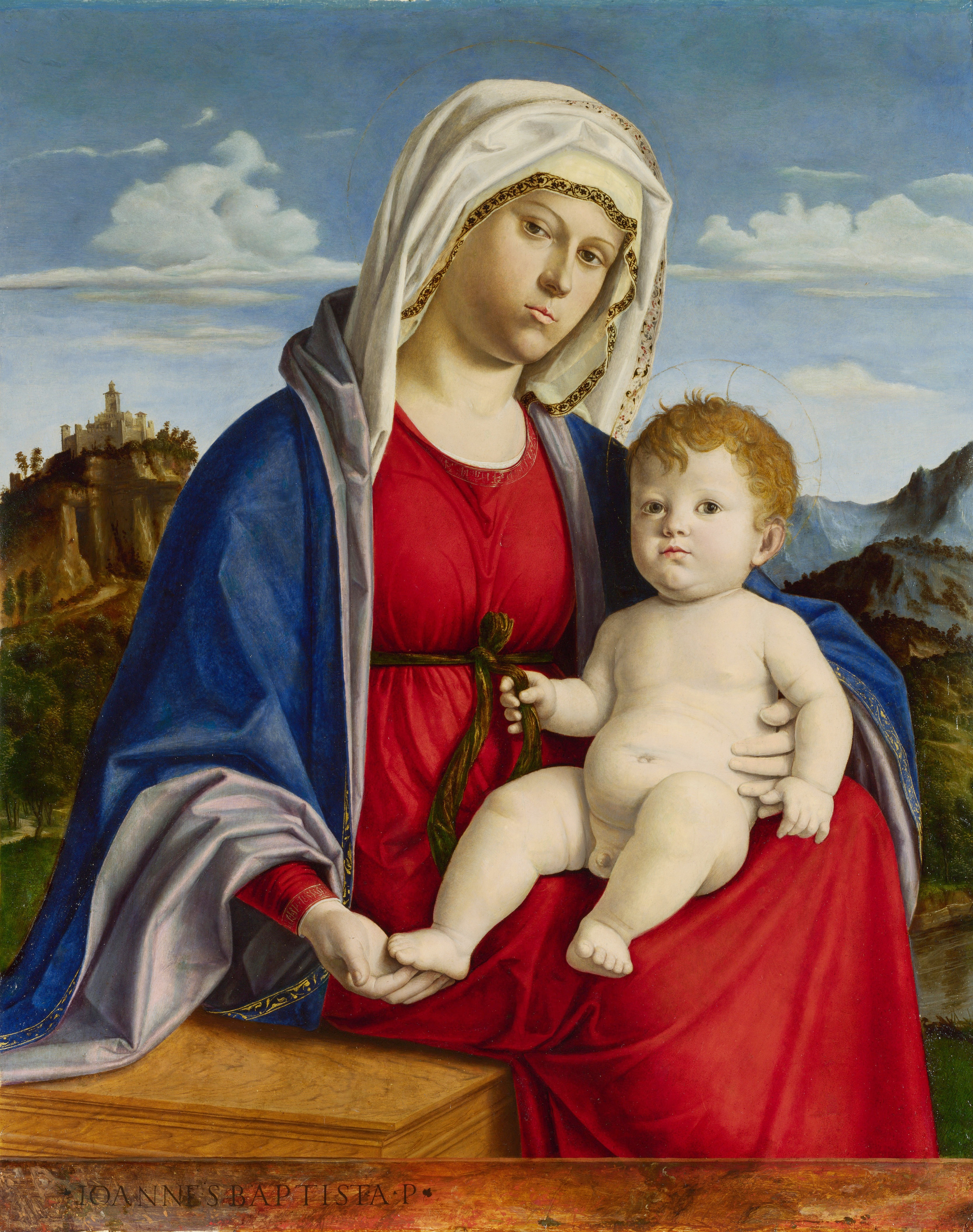
The Virgin and Child (1499–1502) by Cima da Conegliano

The Virgin and Child is a 1499–1502 oil on panel painting by Cima da Conegliano, now in the National Gallery, London, to which it was bequeathed by George Salting in 1910.
