= Modello =

Preparatory study or model of an artwork

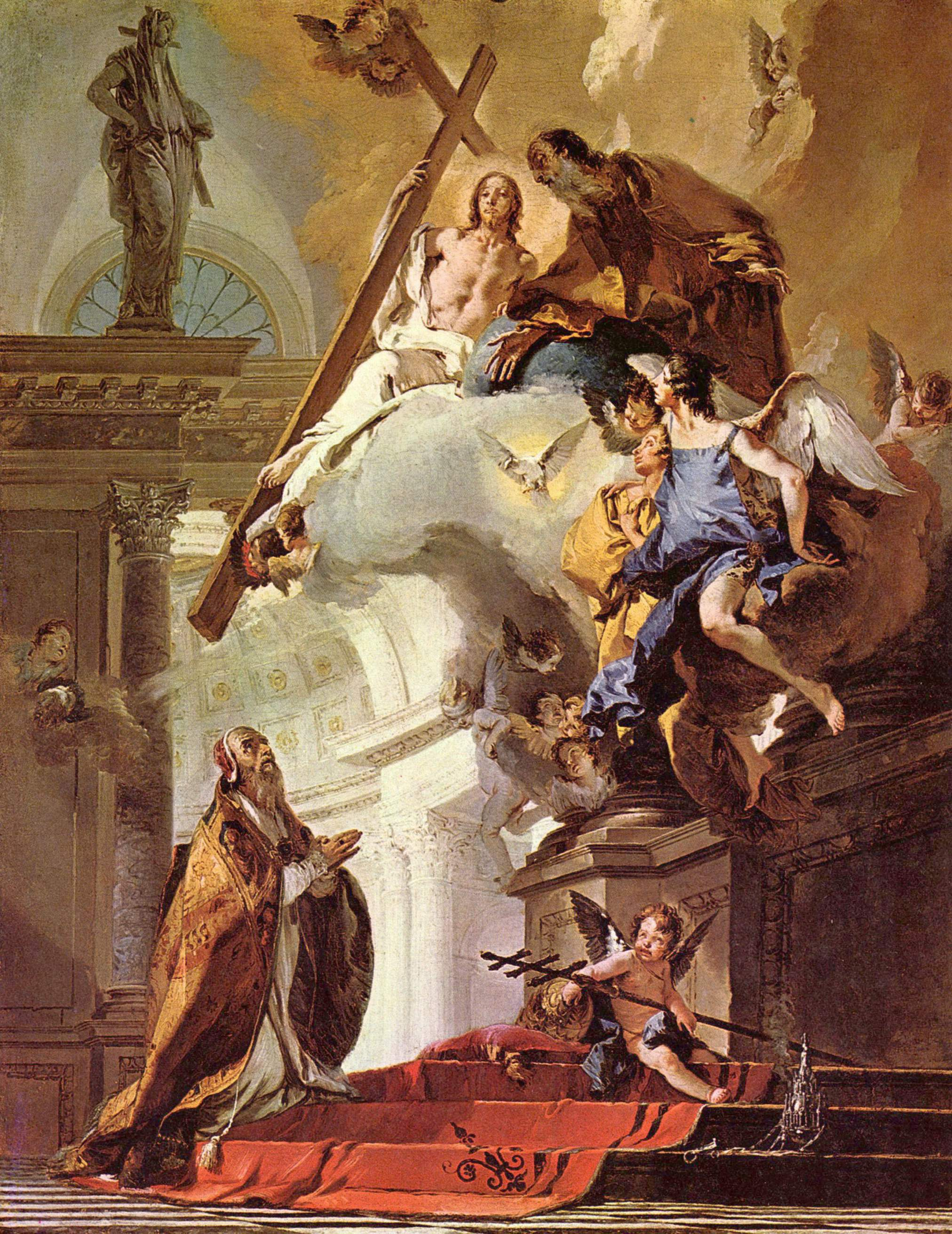
Oil sketch modello by Tiepolo, 69 x 55 cm, for this five-metre-high (16 ft) altarpiece

A modello (from Italian [moˈdɛllo], plural modelli) is a preparatory study or model, usually at a smaller scale, for a work of art or architecture, especially one produced for the approval of the commissioning patron. The term modello gained currency in art circles in Tuscany in the fourteenth century. The term avoids the ambiguity in English of the cognate model, which may equally refer to the finished work of art that provided detailed inspiration for a variant or later copy. Modern definitions in reference works vary somewhat. Alternative and overlapping terms are "oil sketch" (schizzo) and cartoon for paintings, tapestry, or stained glass; maquette, plastico or bozzetto for sculpture or architecture; and architectural model.

== Background ==
Though in Gothic figural arts bishops and abbots are often represented carrying small simulacra of buildings they had constructed – "models" in the familiar modern sense – modello is only used of pieces which pre-date the finished work, and were at least in part produced by the main artist involved. The less frequently found term ricordo (Italian for "record" or "memory") means a similar piece produced as a small copy after completion of the work as a record for the workshop. Naturally it is not always easy for art historians to decide whether a particular piece is one or the other, and, especially in the Late Renaissance and Baroque periods, when several versions of a painting were made, the ricordo for the prime version might serve in the atelier as the modello for the subsequent ones. No doubt a modello was often modified after the main work was completed to reflect any changes in the composition during painting, thus making it a ricordo also; this would normally be impossible for art historians to distinguish from a modello altered during its original production.

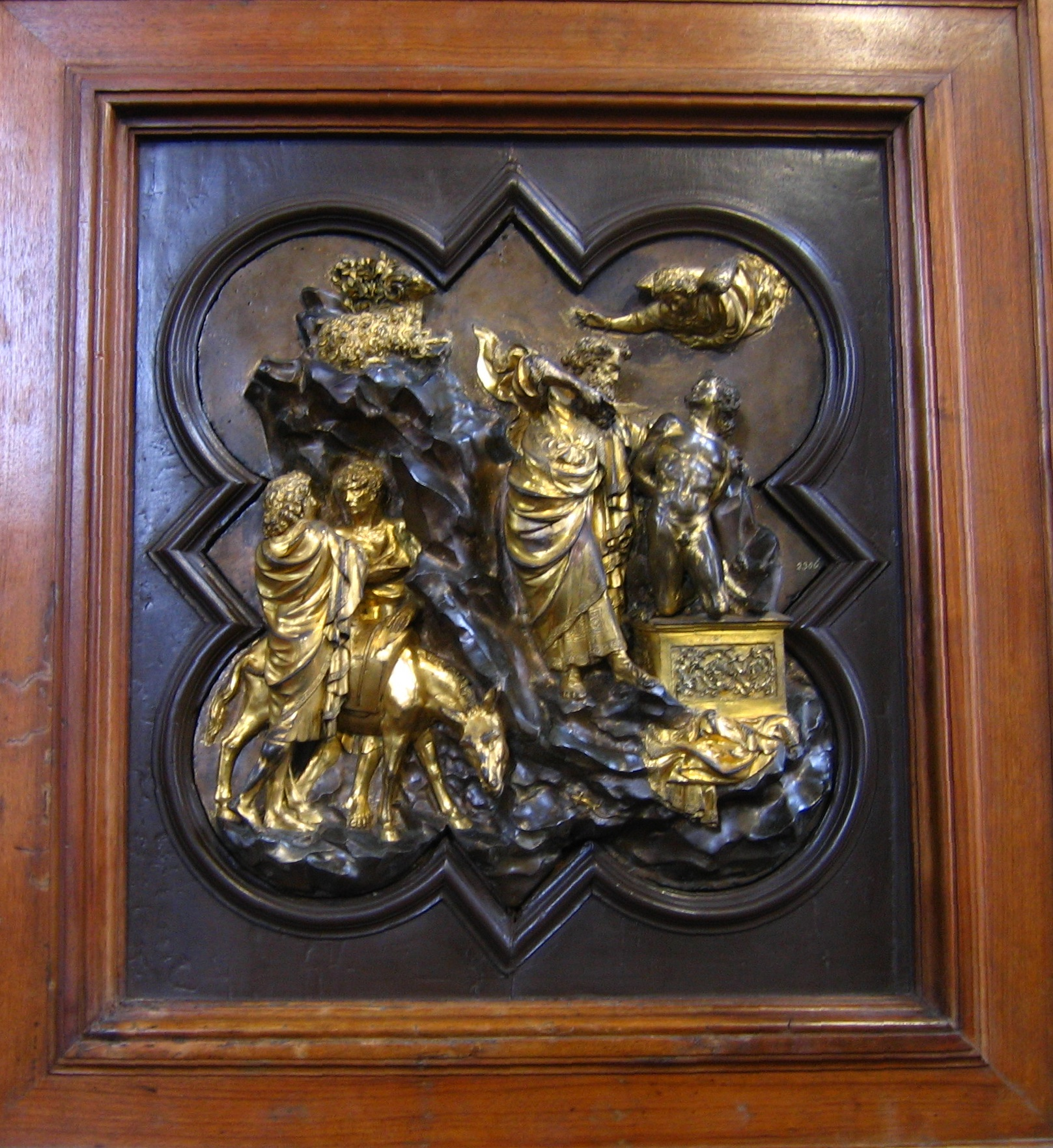
Sacrifice of Isaac; Lorenzo Ghiberti's successful competition modello for the bronze doors of the Florence Baptistry, Bargello.

The Tiepolo above right was catalogued as a modello by Michael Levey, but recent x-ray investigation of the huge finished work in Munich has revealed that in its underpainting it was closer to another, very different and less finished modello, now in the Courtauld Institute, and it has been asserted that the National Gallery picture illustrated is a ricordo. The National Gallery still describe it as "probably a modello", presumably produced after work had already begun.

"Cartoon", named for the sturdy cartone paper on which they were generally executed, is usually used of working drawings, often at full scale, but the distinction is not a firm one, and the terms cartoon and working drawing are often used interchangeably. Often, for example in tapestries, the modello is a design at a considerably reduced scale by the main artist, which is then (after approval by the patron) worked up into a full scale cartoon by the artist or others – probably his assistants; the Raphael Cartoons are much the most famous of the few surviving examples. The weavers then worked from this. Modello is especially used of older Italian art and architecture from the late Middle Ages onwards; initially these were mostly drawings, perhaps with some colour from chalk or watercolour, or with colours indicated in writing. The diminutive term modeletto will always be used of small-scale versions. As an Italian word, modello may be printed in italics, or not. The French version of the word, modèle, may be used of French works, and is normally italicised.

Especially in the case of oil sketches, many modelli are greatly valued in their own right, as they may show a freedom in execution and freshness of inspiration missing in the final work, and also may show changes in composition from the finished work, throwing light on the process of artistic creation. Earlier stages of the creative process may be recorded in "preparatory drawings" or "studies", either for the whole composition, or a part of it, such as a single figure.

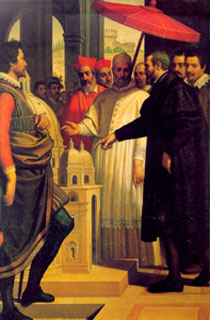
Michelangelo shows Pope Julius II his modellino of St Peter's in this 19th-century artist's impression

== Examples ==
An example of a modello of a fresco cycle, which was rescued for its intrinsic value is in Giorgio Vasari's vita of Rosso Fiorentino: Vasari reports that a modello for Rosso's frescoes in Santa Maria delle Lagrime, Arezzo, was carried out by Rosso for Giovanni Pollastra, the inventor of the complex program there, "un bellisimo modello di tutto l'opera, che è oggi nelle nostre case di Arezzo." A preliminary modello colorito in the form of a painted three-dimensional model was especially important to prejudge the finished effect of illusionistic sotto-in-su perspectives on the curved surfaces of vaulted ceilings, as Andrea Pozzo, the perfector of the illusionistic ceiling, noted in his Perspectiva pictorum et architectorum (1700–17)

Many modelli show versions of works which were never actually realised, or have been lost. Famous examples are the alternative designs produced for the competition in 1401 to design the North doors of the Florence Baptistry. Lorenzo Ghiberti won, beating six other artists, including Filippo Brunelleschi, Donatello and Jacopo della Quercia; the modelli survive, for a single panel, of the first two named (Bargello – picture above).

There are alternative, unrealised, modelli for many famous buildings, including St Peter's, Rome and the "Great Model" of St Paul's Cathedral, London, showing a different design by Sir Christopher Wren from that actually built. When accepted, such models were retained during the work, as concrete expressions of what was expected under the terms of the contract, and afterwards were preserved in storage through salutary neglect.

== See also ==
- Pentimento
