= Transfiguration =

Transfiguration(s) or The Transfiguration may refer to:

== Religion ==
- Transfiguration of Jesus, an event in the Bible
- Feast of the Transfiguration, a Christian holiday celebrating the Transfiguration of Jesus
- Transfiguration (religion), a momentary transformation of a person into some aspect of the divine

== Paintings ==
- Transfiguration (Bellini, Venice), c. 1454–1460
- Transfiguration of Christ (Bellini), c. 1480
- Transfiguration (Lotto), c. 1510—1512
- Transfiguration Altarpiece (Perugino), 1517
- Transfiguration (Pordenone), c. 1515–1516
- Transfiguration (Raphael), c. 1516–1520
- Transfiguration (Rubens), 1604–1605
- Transfiguration (Savoldo), c. 1530

== Film and television ==
- The Transfiguration (film), a 2016 American film
- Transfiguration (Harry Potter), a subject taught at Hogwarts in Harry Potter media
- "Transfigurations", a 1990 episode of Star Trek: The Next Generation

== Literature ==
- Transfigurations (novel), a 1979 novel by Michael Bishop

== Music ==
- Transfiguration (Artemiy Artemiev & Peter Frohmader album), 2002
- Transfiguration (Alice Coltrane album), 1978
- Transfiguration (James Brandon Lewis album), 2024
- "Transfiguration", a song by Aghora from the album Aghora, 2003
- "Transfiguration", a song by Hillsong Worship from Open Heaven / River Wild , 2015
- "Transfiguration", a song by Your Memorial from Redirect, 2012
- "Transfiguation #1" and "Transfiguration #2", a song by M. Ward from Transfiguration of Vincent, 2003
- "The Transfiguration", a song by Sufjan Stevens from Seven Swans, 2004

== See also ==
- Church of the Transfiguration (disambiguation), including uses of Transfiguration Church and other variants
- Transfiguration Cathedral (disambiguation)
