= Ascension of Jesus in Christian art =

Frequent subject in Christian art

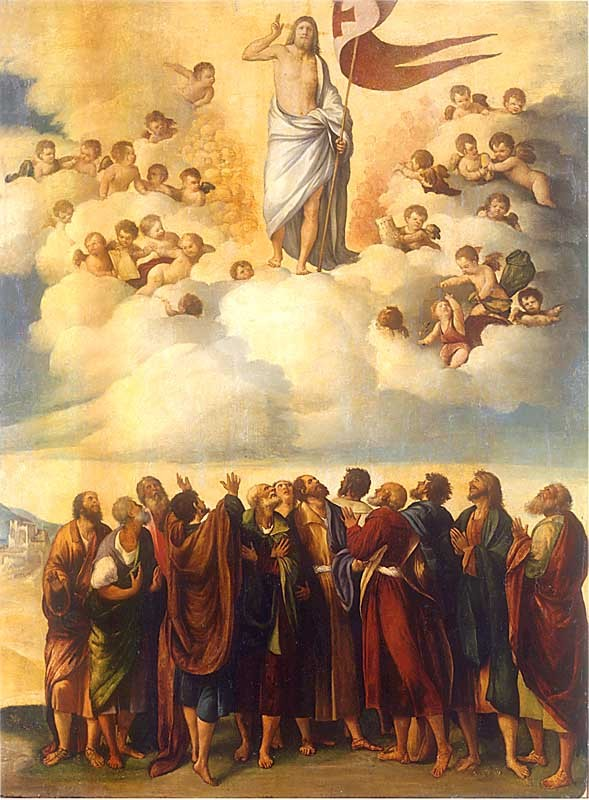
The Ascension, by Dosso Dossi, 16th century. Many Ascension scenes have an upper (Heavenly) and a lower (earthly) part.

The Ascension of Jesus to Heaven as stated in the New Testament has been a frequent subject in Christian art, as well as a theme in theological writings.

The earliest direct depictions of the Ascension date to around the beginnings of the 5th century, often based on the Hand of God representations and by the 6th century the iconography had been established.

In many depictions, (and always in the Eastern Church) the Virgin Mary is at the center of the group of Apostles (representing the Church) who look upwards towards the ascending Jesus who usually signals a blessing with his right hand.

== Development of the iconography ==
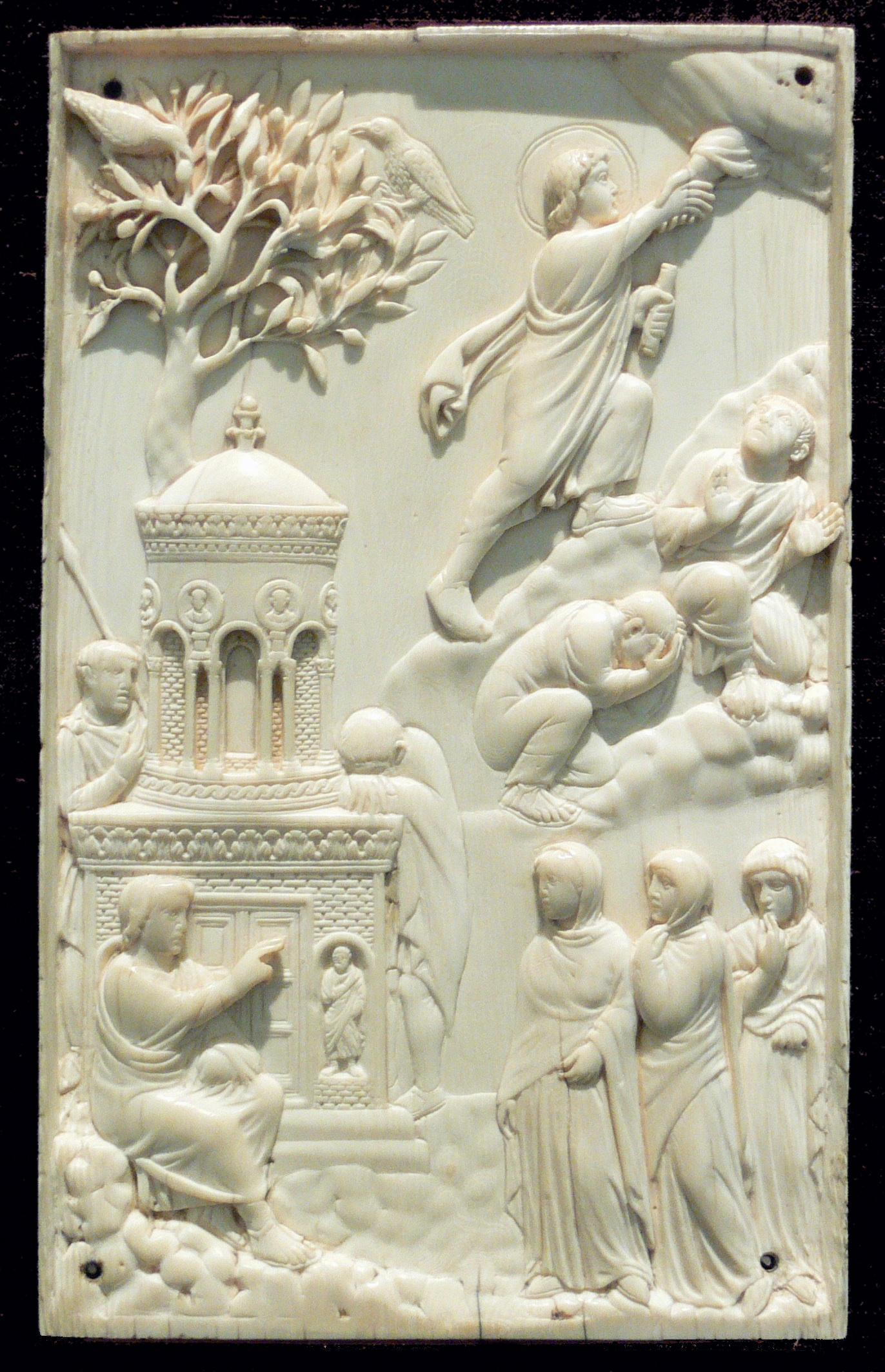
Ascension of Christ and Noli me tangere, c. 400, ivory, Milan or Rome, now in Munich. See below for a similar Ascension 450 years later.

New Testament scenes that appear in the Early Christian art of the 3rd and 4th centuries typically deal with the works and miracles of Jesus such as healings, the multiplication of the loaves or the raising of Lazarus. Although versions of the subject of Christ in Majesty, which show the resurrected and ascended Christ in heaven, appear earlier, the Ascension itself is not depicted until about 400. In early scenes Christ may be shown striding up a mountain, at times the Hand of God reaching from within the clouds to assist him.

An ivory plaque in Munich with such a scene is usually dated around 400, and is possibly the earliest Ascension image. This was to remain the most common type in the West for several centuries, and for example is repeated in the Drogo Sacramentary some 450 years later (see gallery). The crucifixion scene is virtually unknown in the 5th century and rare until the 6th century. By the 6th century, however, more images of both the Crucifixion and the Ascension began to appear, perhaps as a result of the theological discussions of the late 4th and early 5th centuries.

The Rabbula Gospels (c. 586) include some of the earliest images of the Crucifixion and Ascension, and in their Ascension depictions the Virgin Mary occupies a central position among the Apostles; Christ appears in a mandorla above, accompanied by angels. This was to remain the standard Byzantine and Eastern Orthodox depiction.

By the 6th century the iconography of the Ascension had been established and by the 9th century Ascension scenes were being depicted on domes of churches. In some representations there may be no mountain and he may be climbing a mandorla, or be lifted towards Heaven in a mandorla by angels. In Romanesque depictions sometimes just the feet of Christ are shown as he disappears up into the clouds; this depiction was apparently a rare icongraphic innovation of Anglo-Saxon art which spread to the continent and became the most popular in Northern Europe, where it lingered in provincial wood reliefs until well after the Reformation. Sometimes the last two footprints of Christ on the rock are seen; these were shown to pilgrims at what is now the Chapel of the Ascension on the Mount of Olives in Jerusalem. The scene may also include the Apostles, two men in white and the Virgin Mary.

The Ascension of Jesus is not the only depiction of ascension and other figures, such as John the Evangelist, have been separately depicted as ascending to Heaven, following a medieval story in the Golden Legend. The name of the Assumption of Mary indicates that this was a passive transit; depictions in art often show her being carried up on a cloud by angels.

== Composition and meaning ==
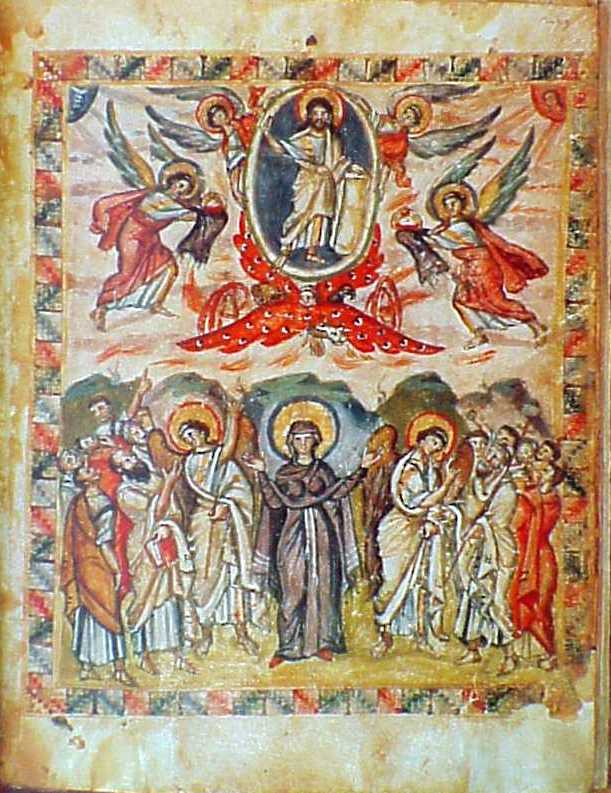
Ascension in the Rabbula Gospels, 6th century

Ascension scenes fall naturally into two zones, an upper heavenly part and a lower earthly part. The ascending Christ may be carrying a resurrection banner or make a sign of benediction with his right hand. The blessing gesture by Christ with his right hand is directed towards the earthly group below him and signifies that he is blessing the entire Church. In the left hand he may be holding a Gospel or a scroll, signifying teaching and preaching. From the Renaissance on the angels may not be present.

The earthly part of the Ascension depictions do not only represent those believed to have been present at the Ascension, but the entire Church. In some Ascension depictions both Apostle Paul and the Virgin Mary may be present. Given Paul converted to Christianity after the Ascension, and that the New Testament does not directly place the Virgin Mary at the Ascension, these depictions represent "the Church" rather than the specific individuals. In Orthodox icons the Virgin Mary is at the center and Christ can be depicted in a mandorla, supported by angels. Christ may be crowned in many such depictions. Given that the Gospels do not mention that the Virgin Mary was a witness to the Ascension, her presence of the Virgin Mary in 5th and 6th century depictions of the Ascension such as those in the Rabbula Gospels are an indication of the important role she played in the art of that period. This approximate composition was to become typical in the West by the Renaissance.

The Eastern Orthodox portrayal of the Ascension is a major metaphor for the mystical nature of the Church. Orthodox tradition holds that the Virgin Mary was present during the Ascension and the Great Vespers of the Ascension state: "She who as your Mother suffered at your Passion more than all, should also enjoy the surpassing joy of the glorifying of your flesh." Thus in many Eastern icons the Virgin Mary is placed at the center of the scene in the earthly part of the depiction, with her hands raised towards Heaven, often accompanied by various Apostles. The upwards looking depiction of the earthly group matches the Eastern liturgy on the Feast of the Ascension: "Come, let us rise and turn our eyes and thoughts high..." Icons are an inherent part of the liturgy of the Eastern Church and icons of the Ascensions are used in the procession on the feast of the Ascension.

Other scenes with a similar raised figure, that used similar compositions to the Ascension are the Assumption of Mary, rare until the late Middle Ages, the Transfiguration of Jesus, and from the Early Renaissance the Resurrection of Jesus, where he begins to be seen floating clear of the tomb. Perhaps the earliest surviving works to show this iconography of the Resurrection is the well-known fresco by Andrea da Firenze in the Spanish Chapel of the Basilica of Santa Maria Novella in Florence, which dates to 1366.

== Gallery ==
=== Western church ===
==== Paintings and mosaic ====
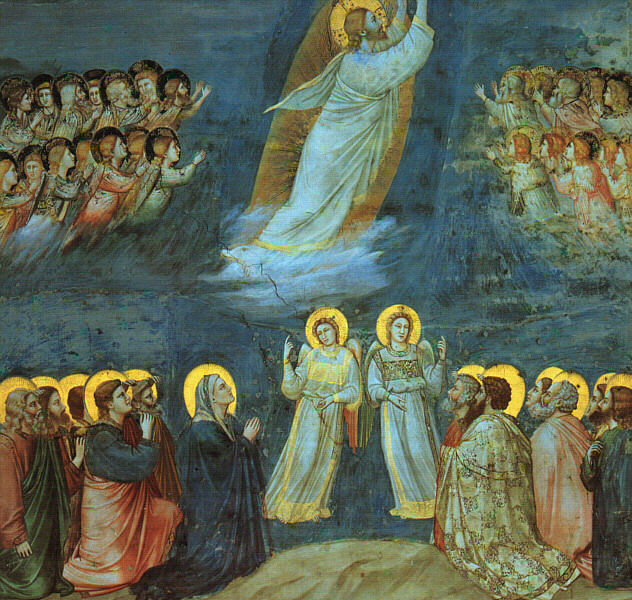
Giotto, 14th century

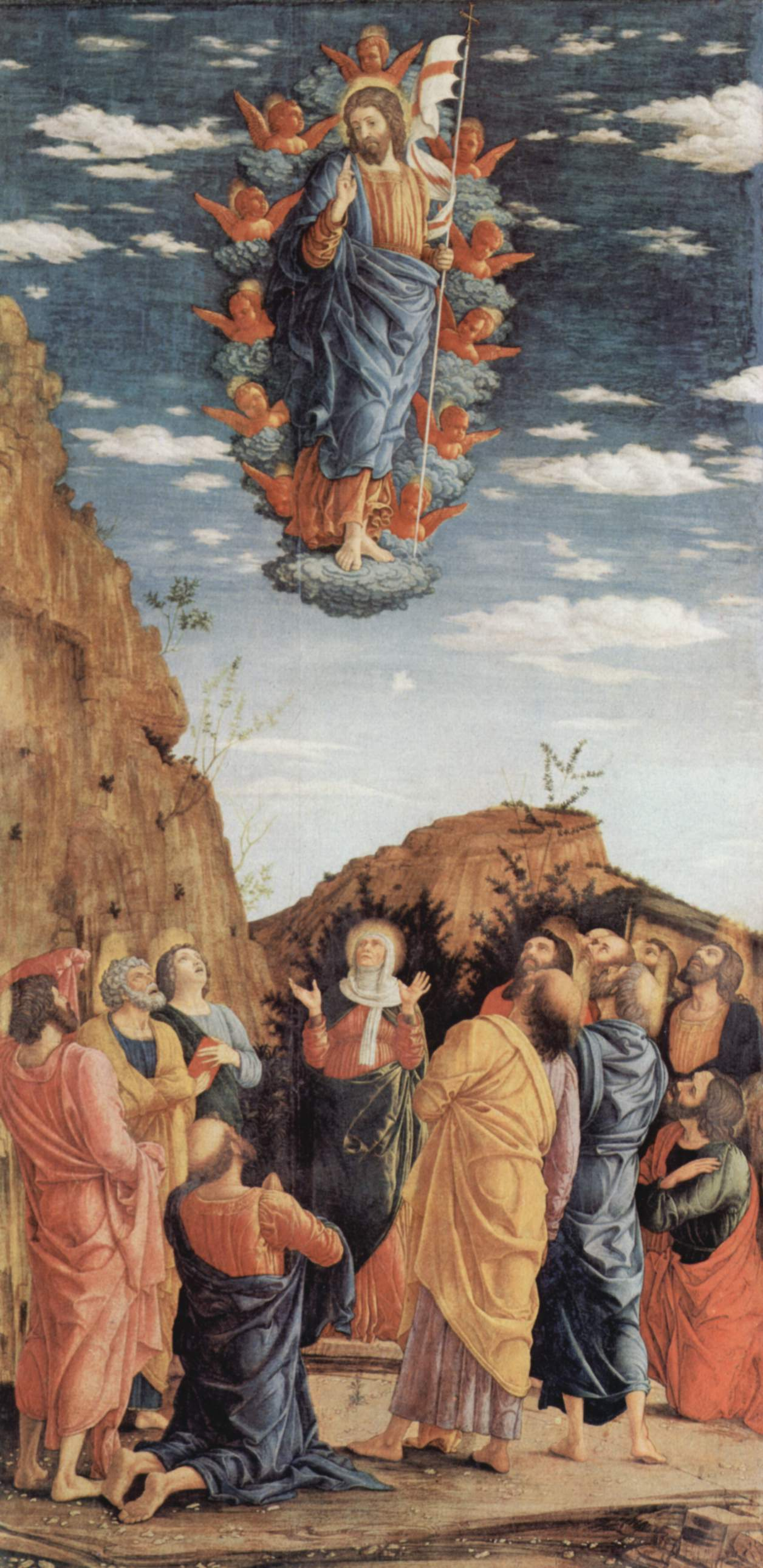
Andrea Mantegna, 1461

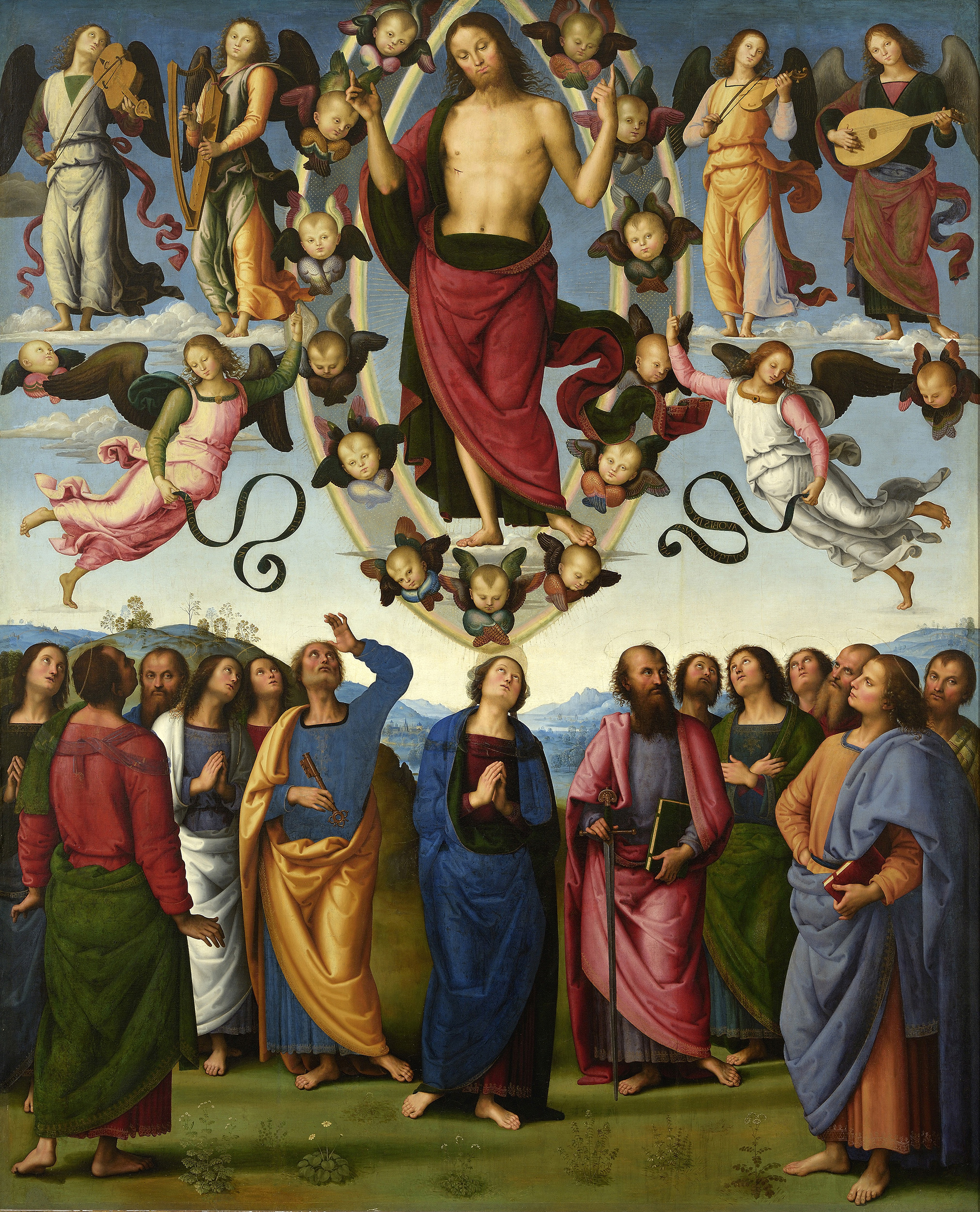
Pietro Perugino, San Pietro Polyptych, 1496–1500

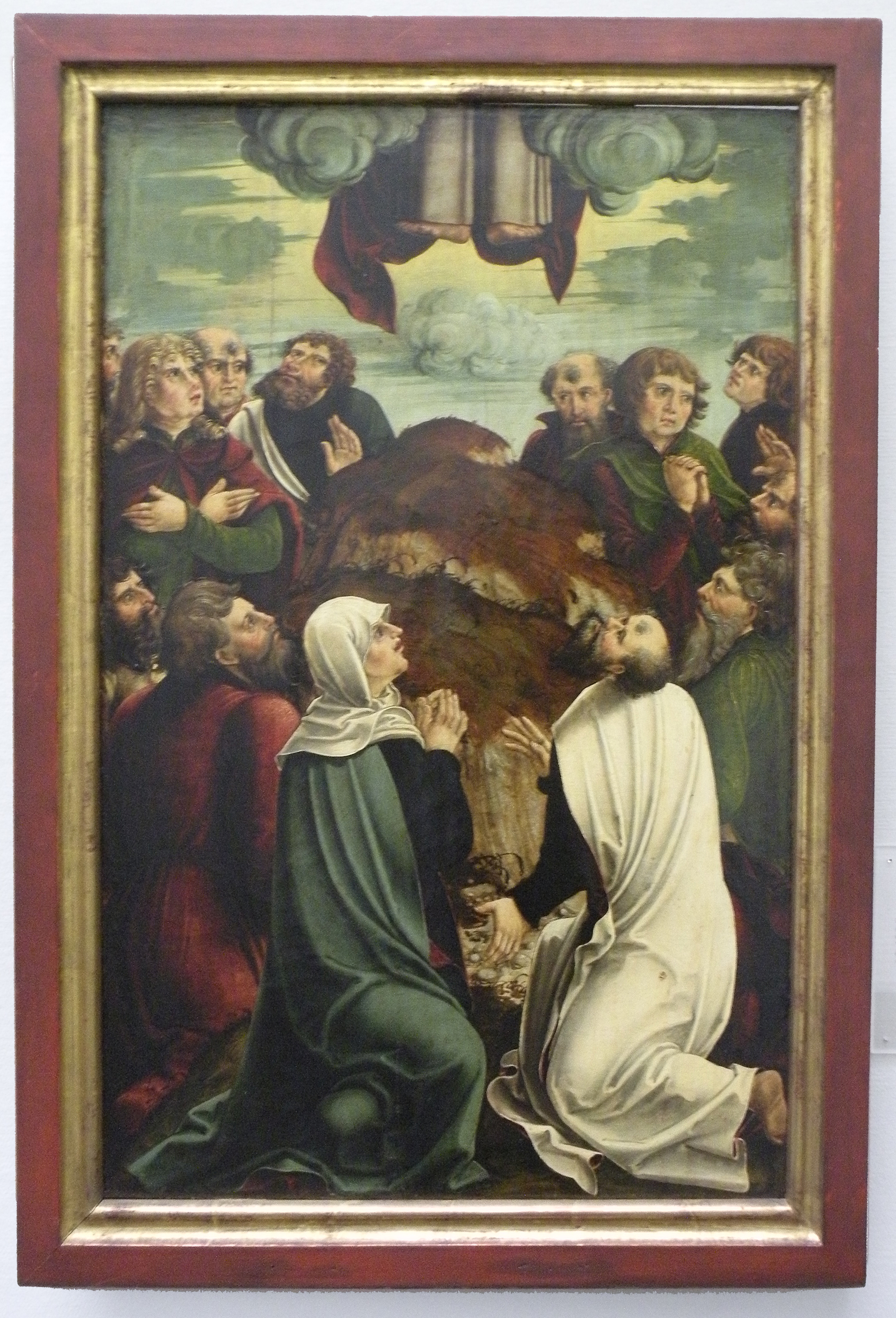
16th century, German "disappearing feet"

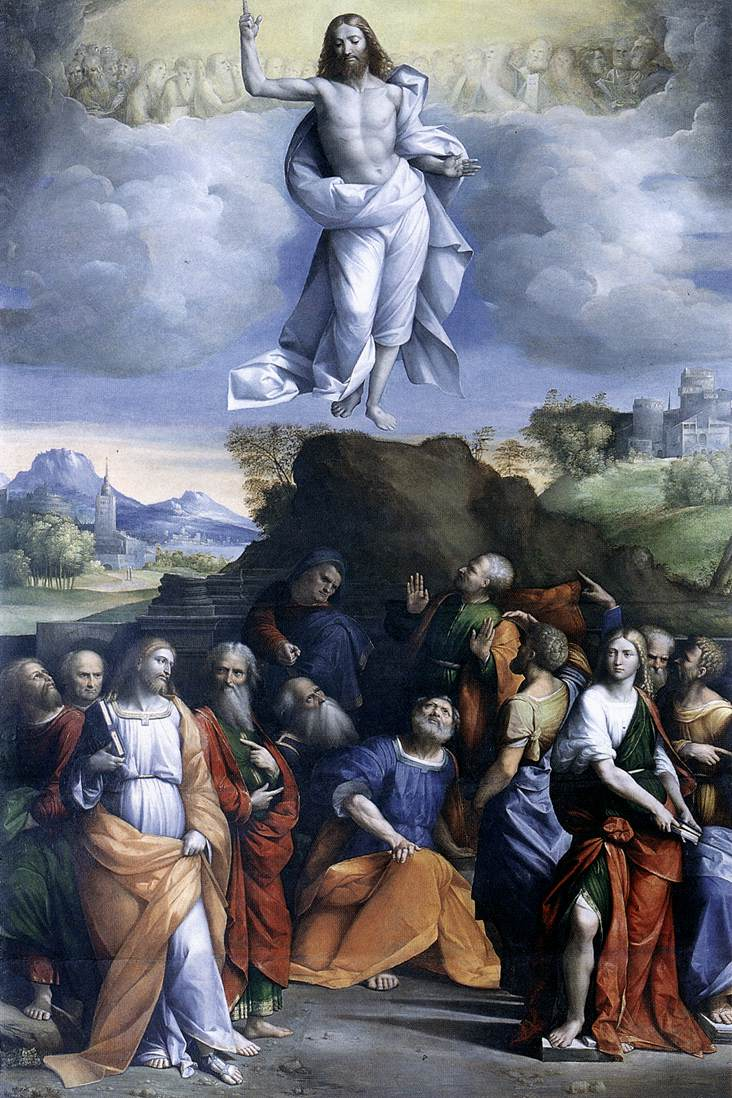
Garofalo, 1510–1520

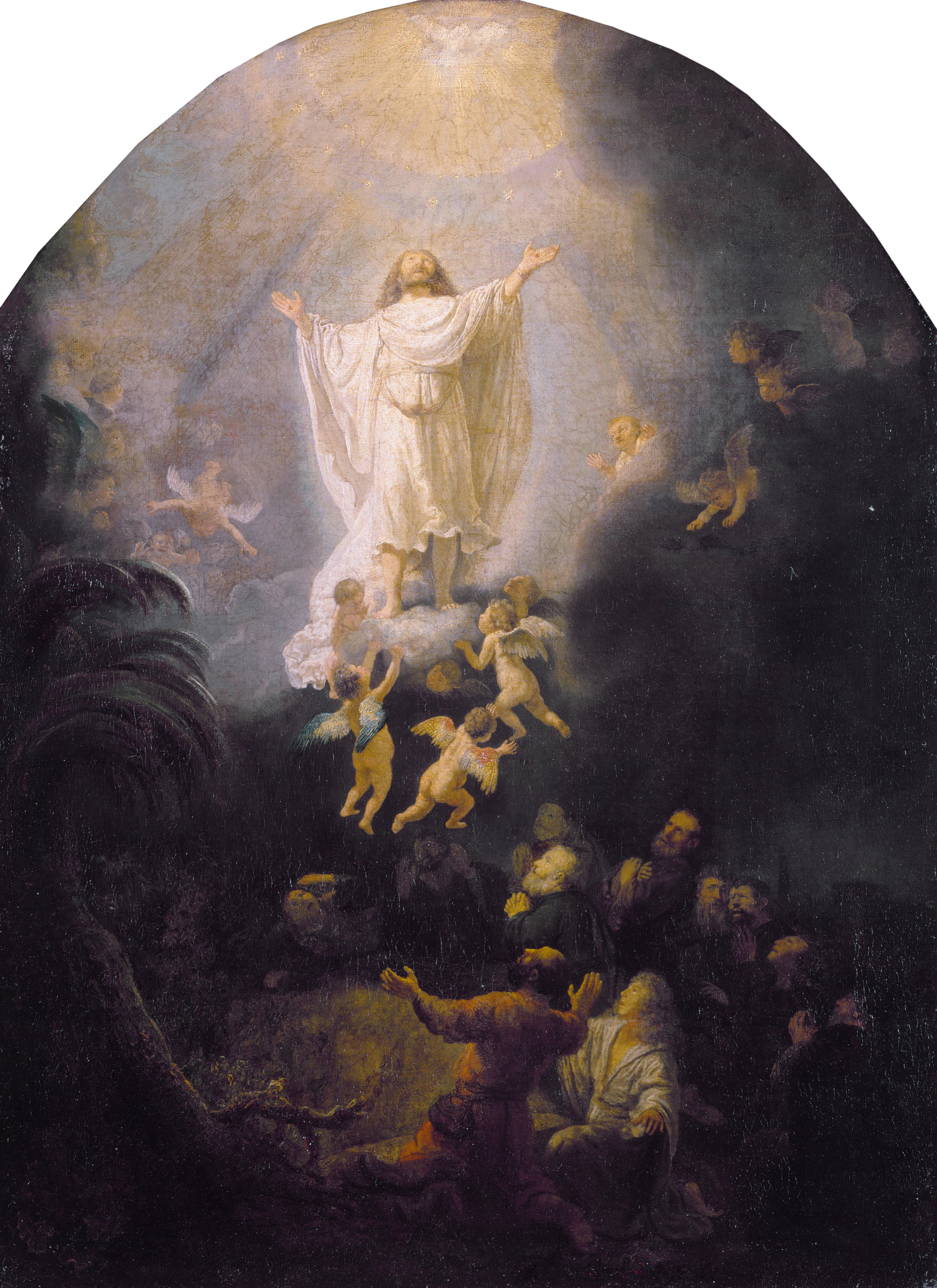
Rembrandt, 1636

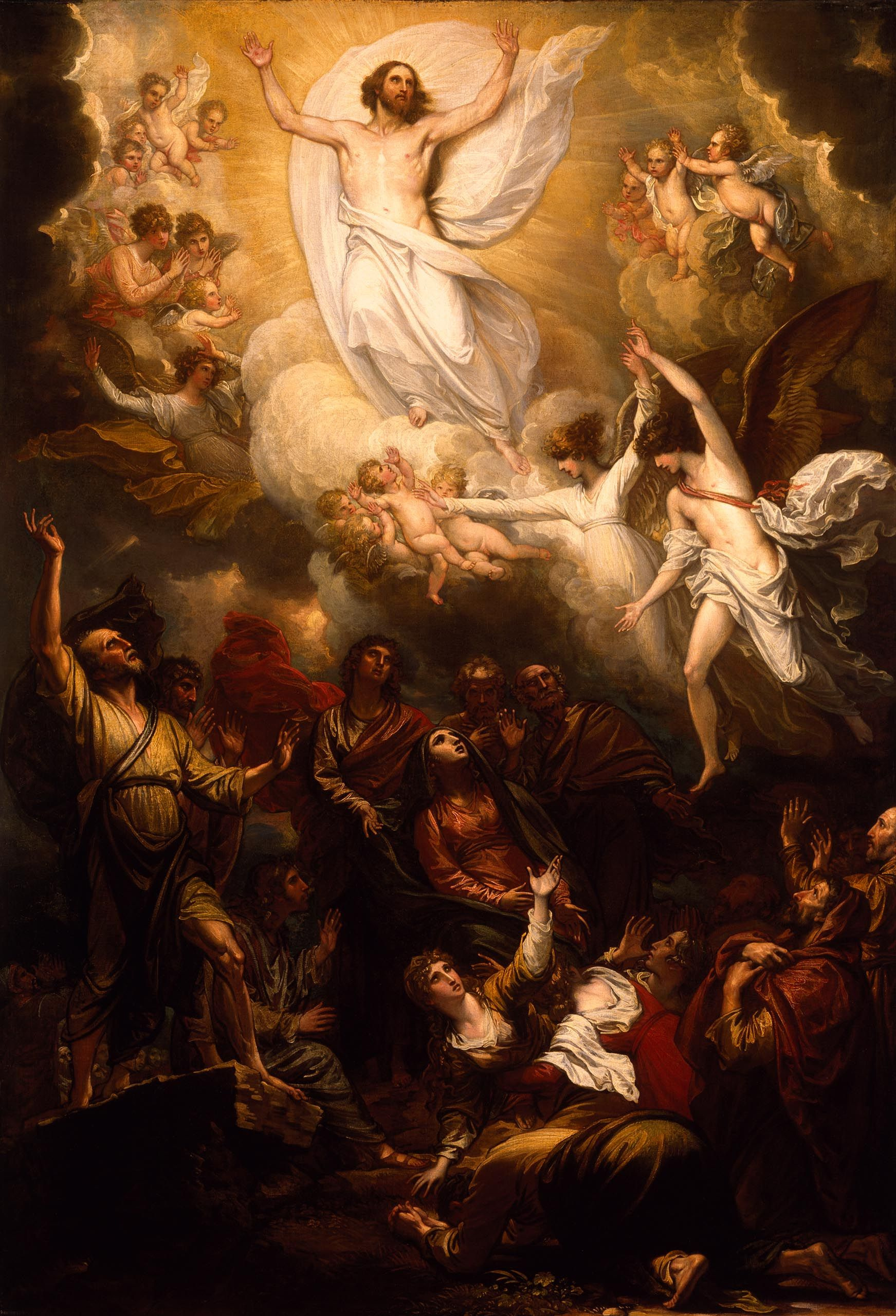
Benjamin West 1801

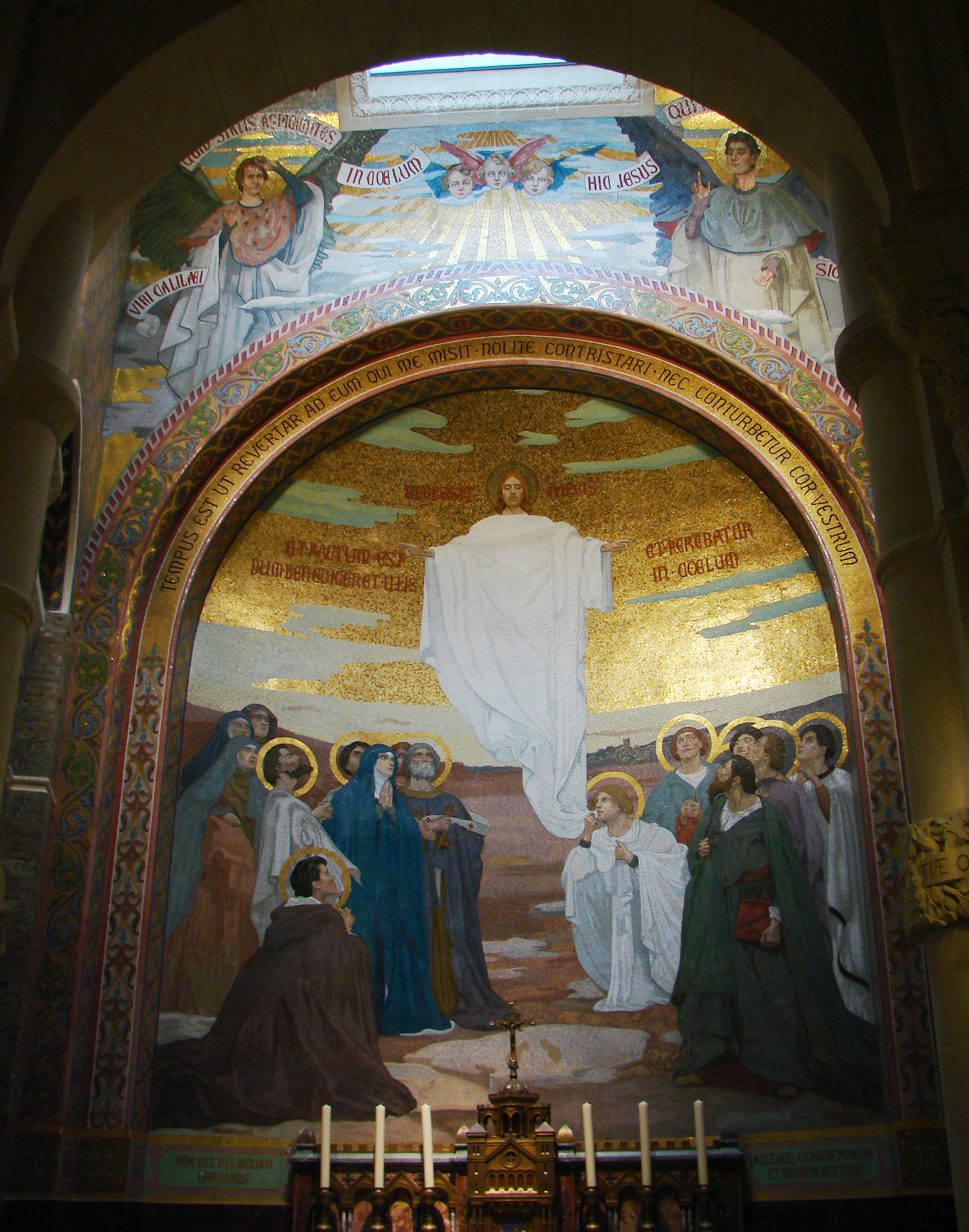
Rosary Basilica, Lourdes, 19th century

==== Illuminated manuscripts ====
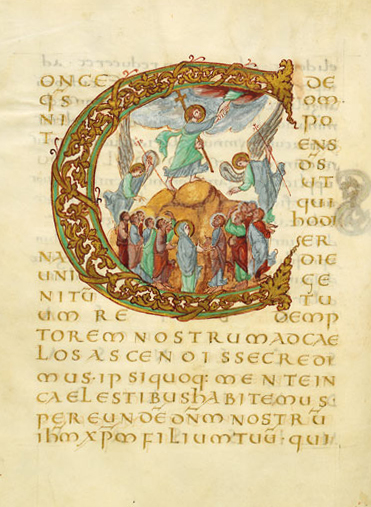
Drogo Sacramentary, c. 850

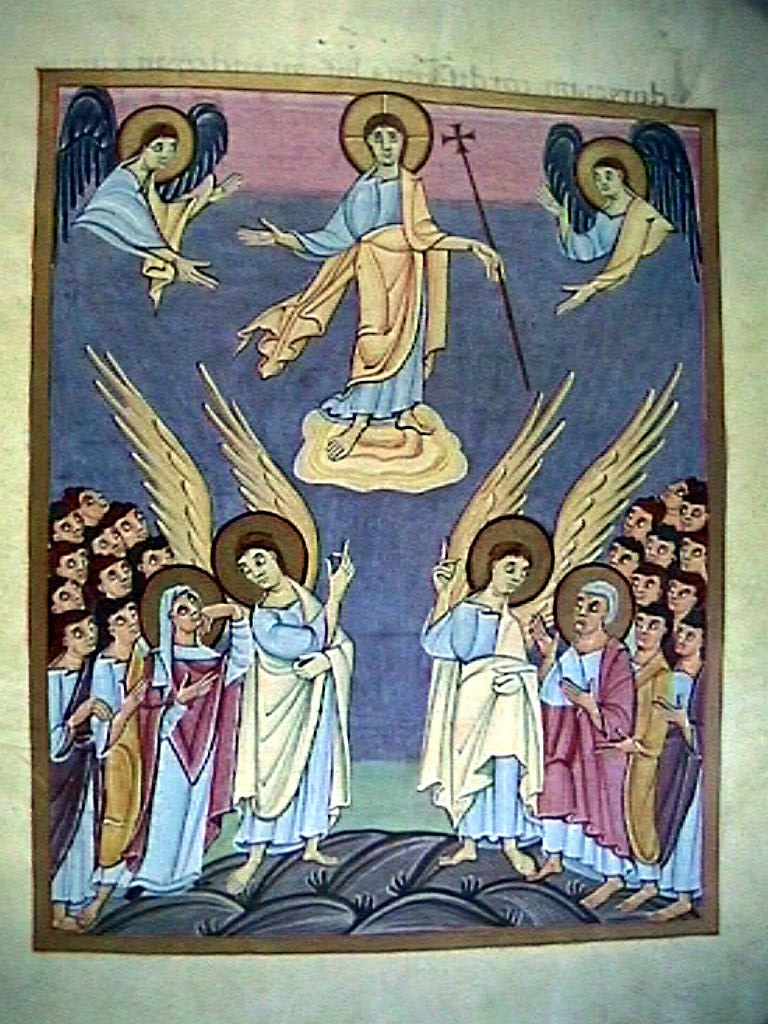
Bamberg Apocalypse, 11th century

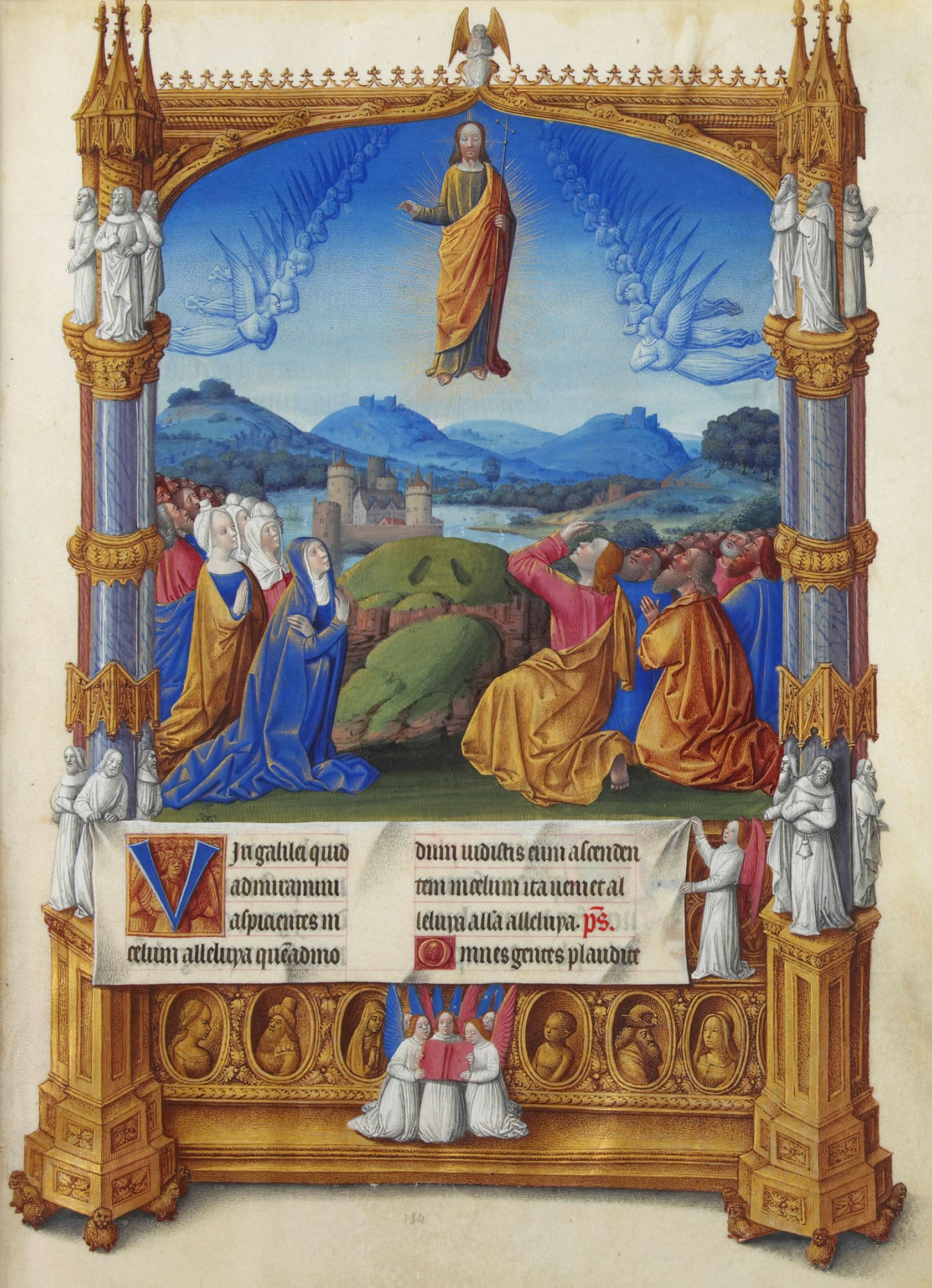
Très Riches Heures du Duc de Berry, c. 1410

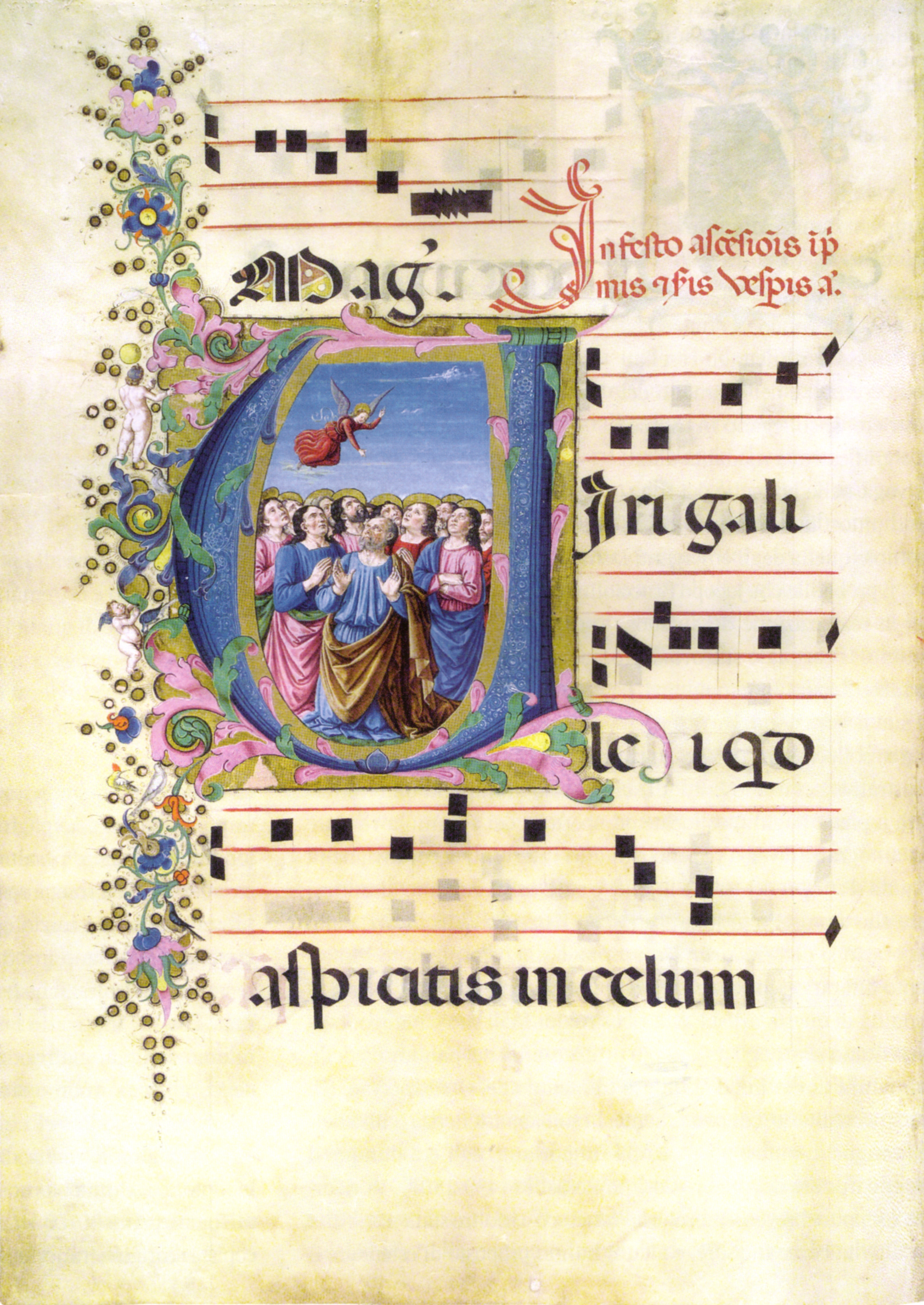
Workshop of Ghirlandaio, 15th century

==== Relief depictions ====
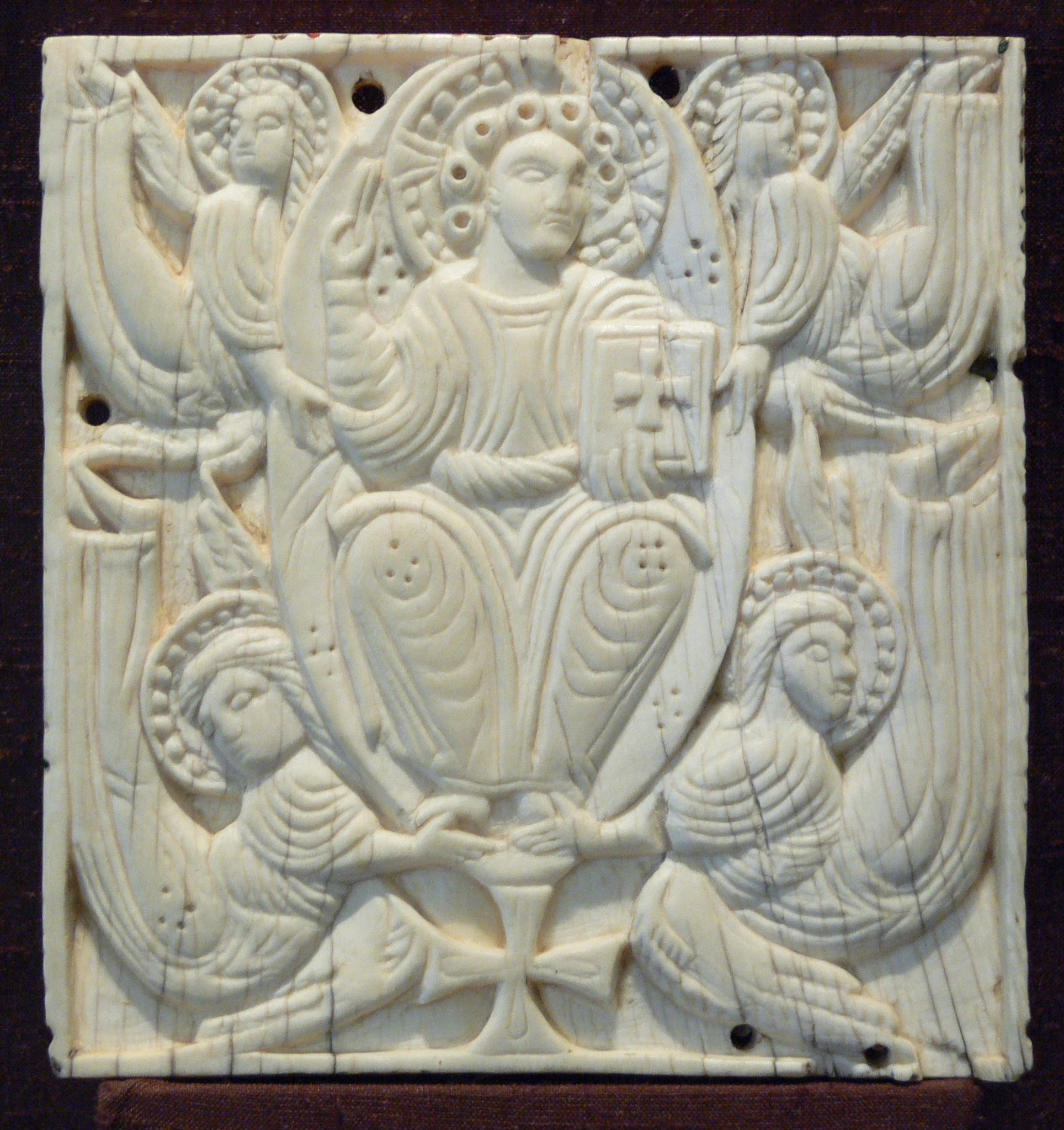
Anglo-Saxon(?) ivory relief, 8th century

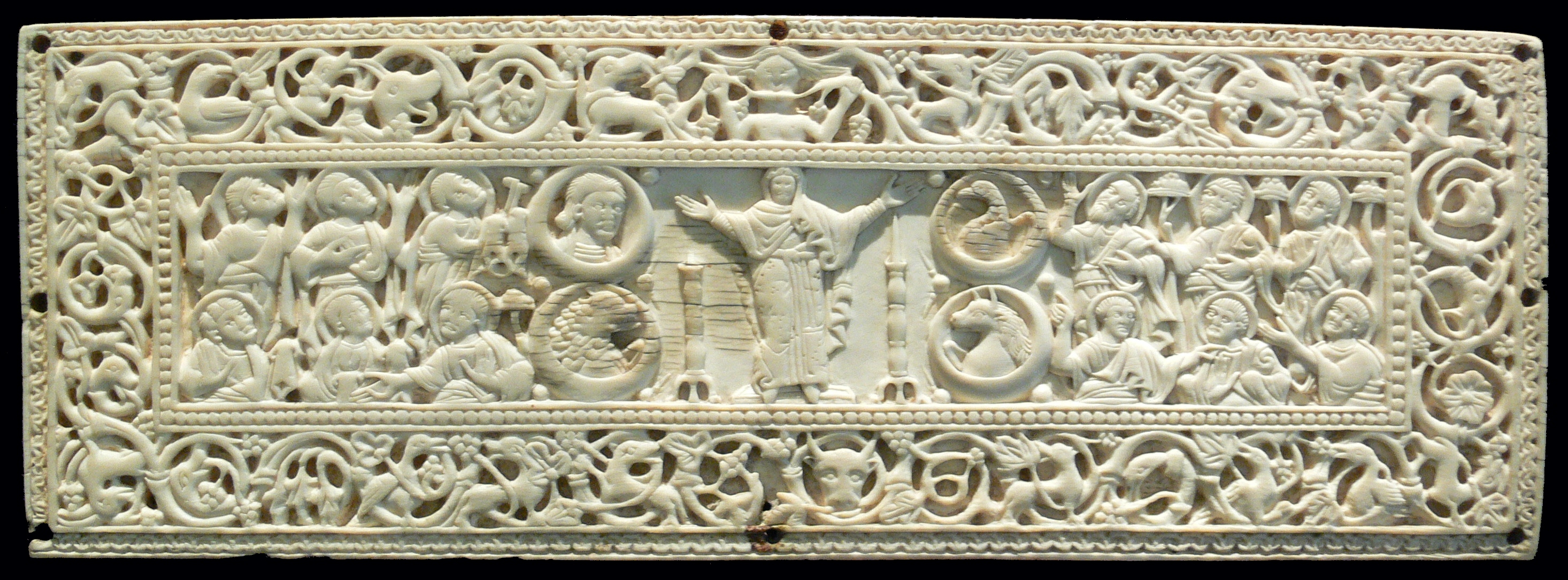
Unusual Anglo-Saxon or Alpine, ivory box cover, c. 750–800, with Mary and the Evangelists' symbols

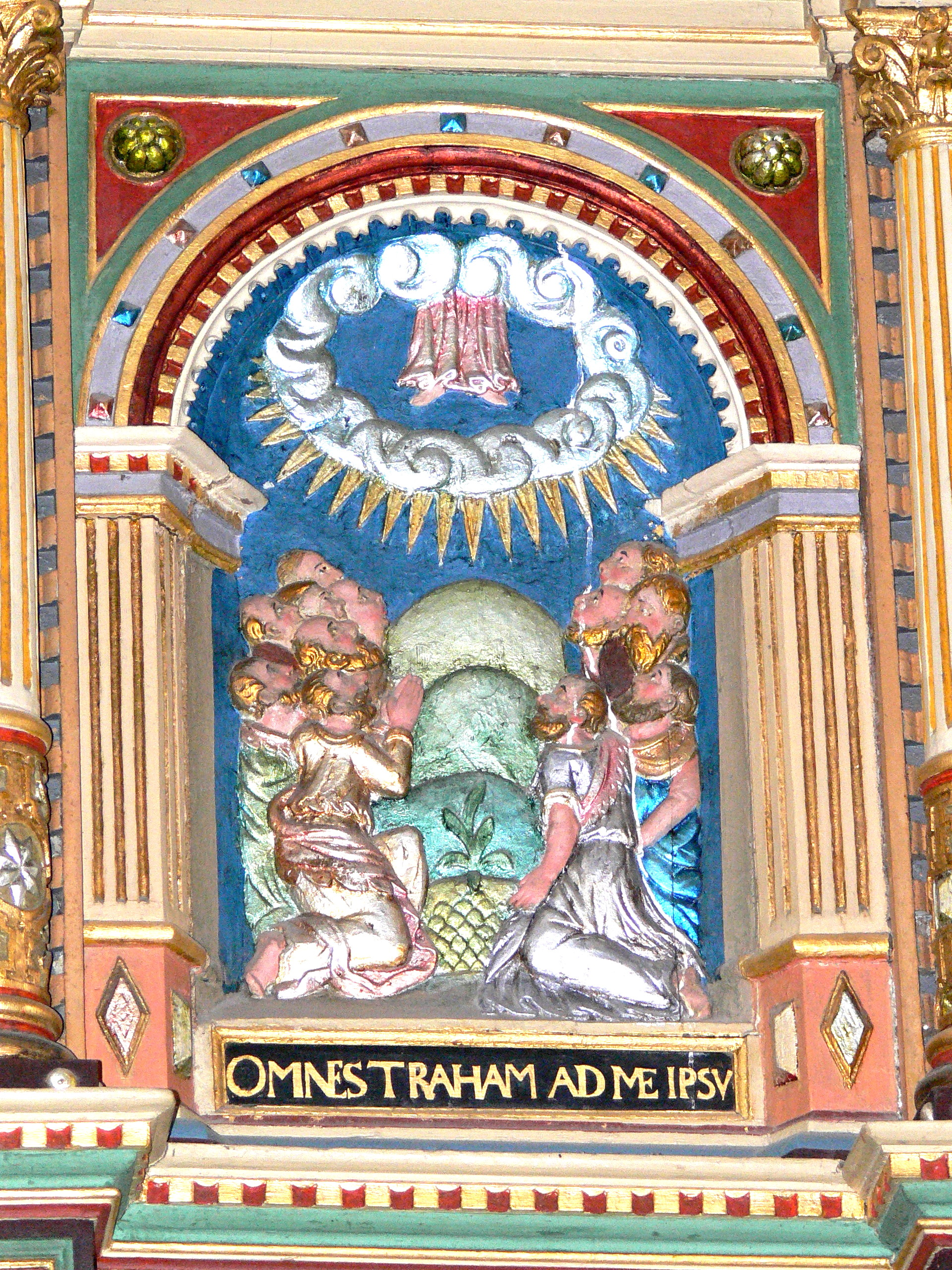
A rather late version of the "disappearing feet" depiction in wood relief, 1597

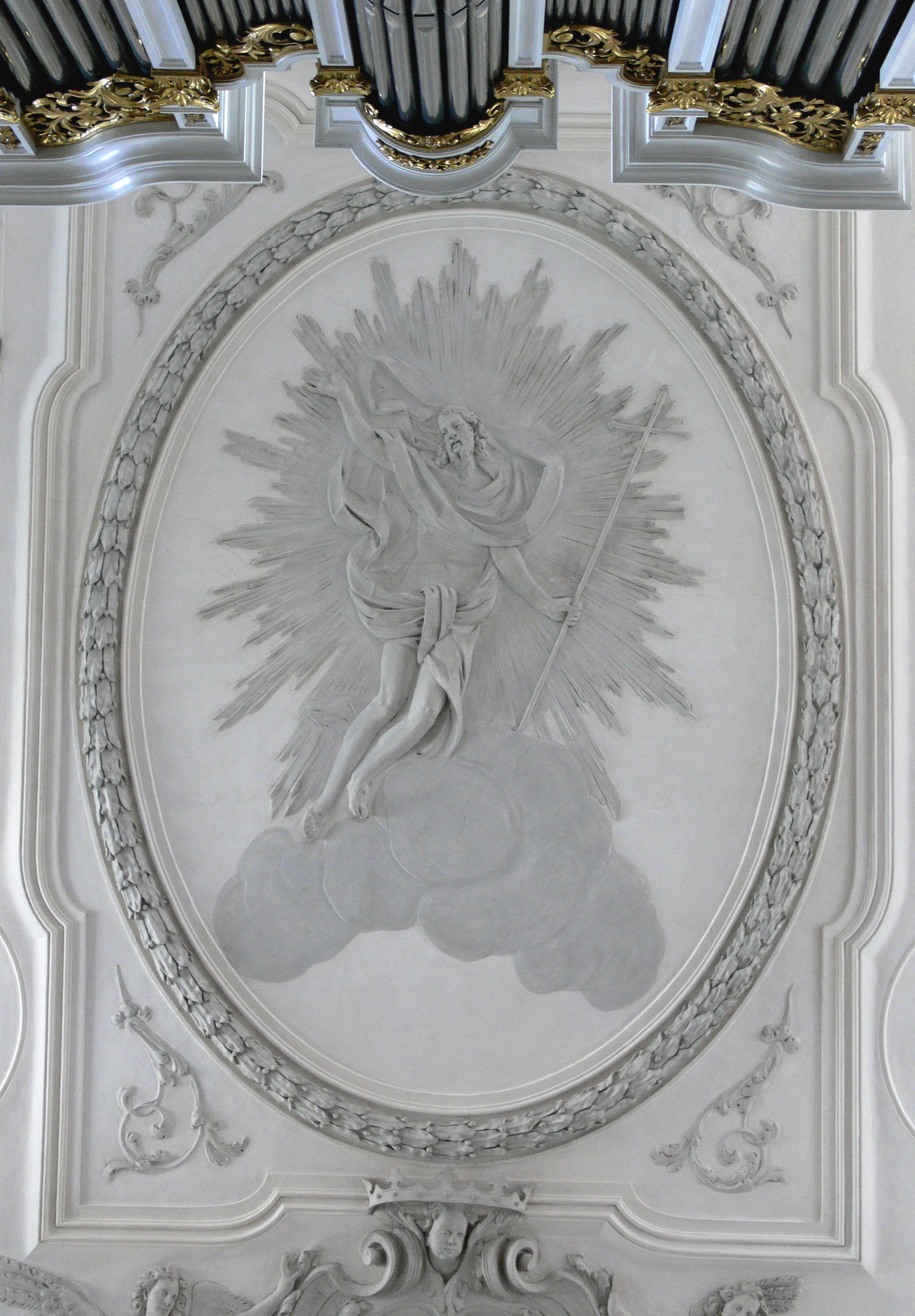
Christ ascending alone, Aulendorf, Germany, 1711

=== Eastern church ===
==== Icons and mosaic ====
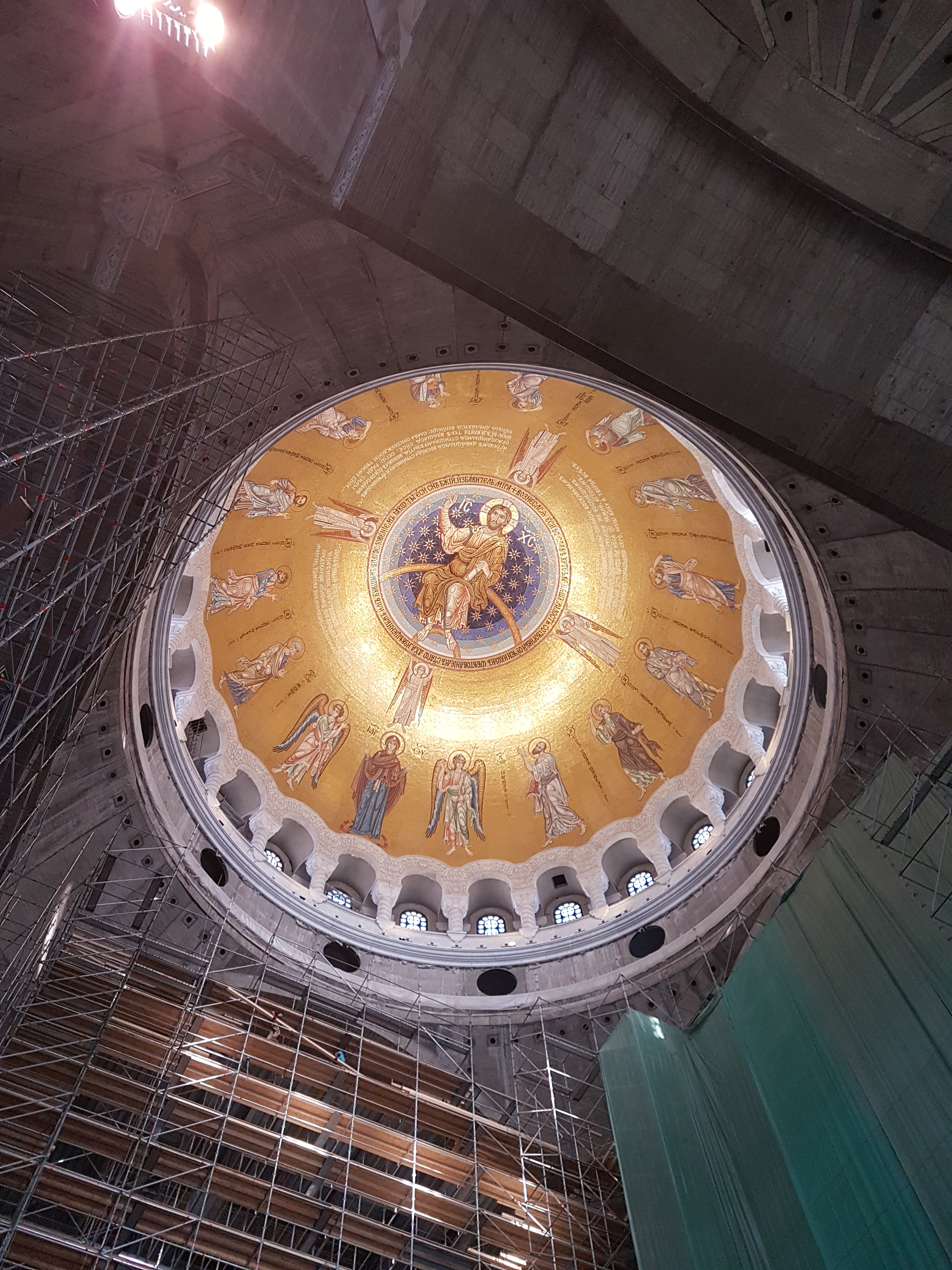
Biggest mosaic of Ascension of Jesus in Christian world which weighs 40 tons in central dome of Saint Sava Cathedral in Belgrade

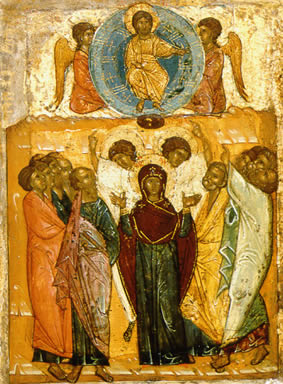
14th century Novgorod school

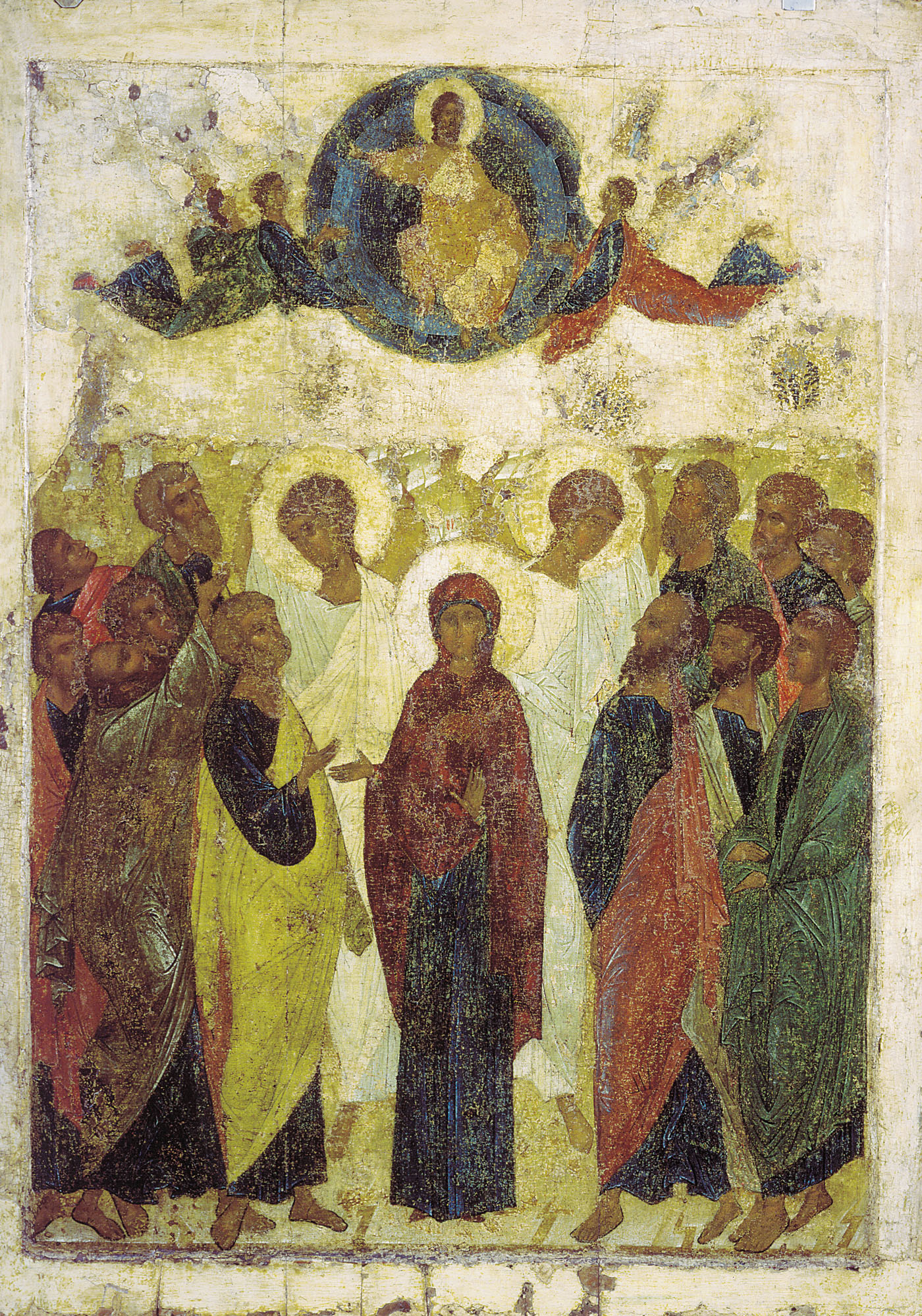
Andrei Rublev, 1408

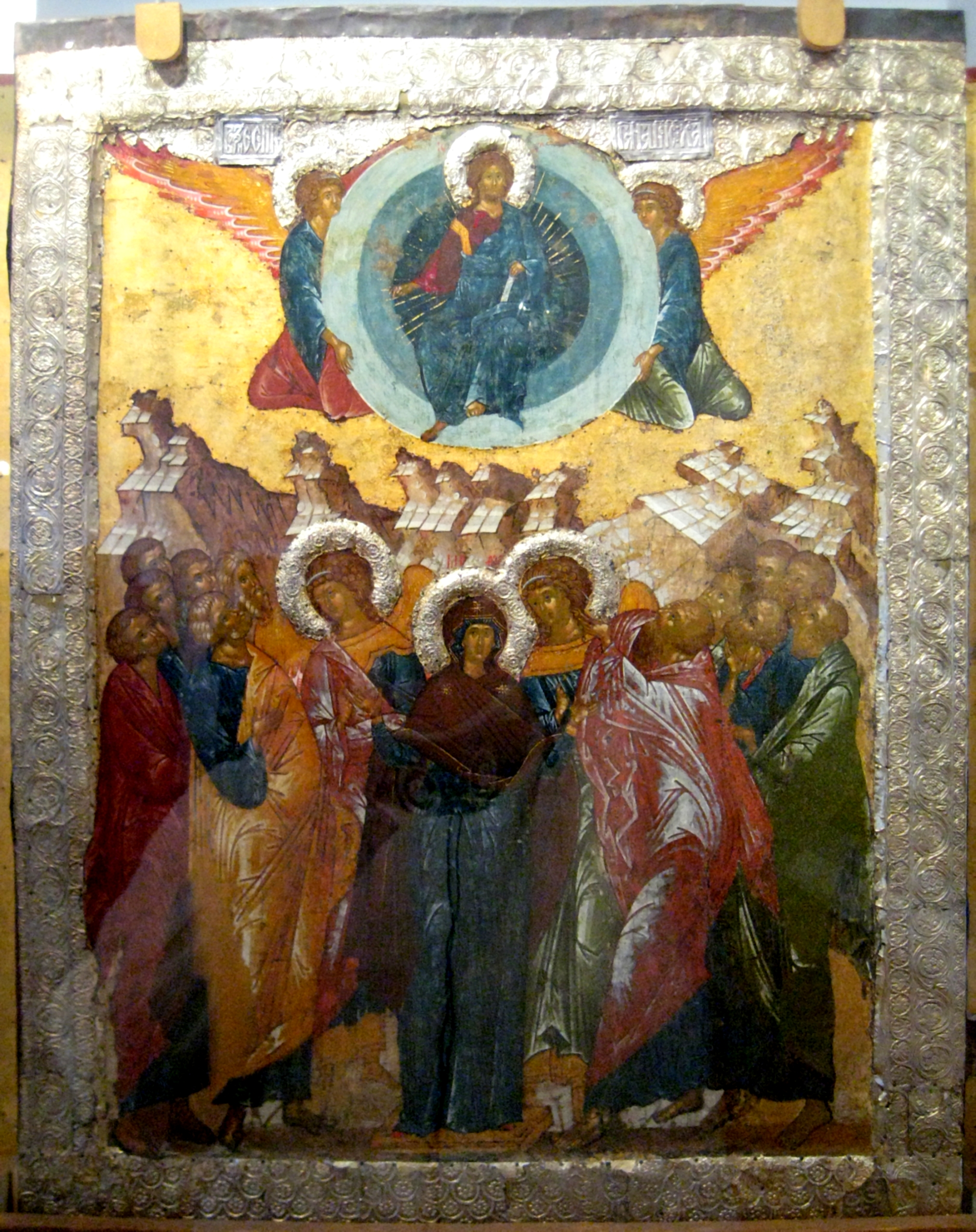
St. Cyril-Belozersky Monastery, 1497

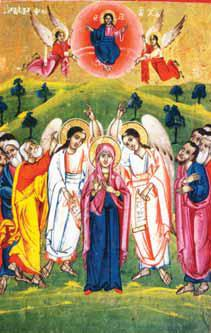
19th century Bulgarian icon, Bitola, modern Northern Macedonia

== See also ==
- Art in Roman Catholicism
- Christian art
- Resurrection of Jesus in Christian art
- The Reformation and art
- Transfiguration of Jesus in Christian art
