= Feast of the Transfiguration =

Christian feast day

The Transfiguration of the Lord
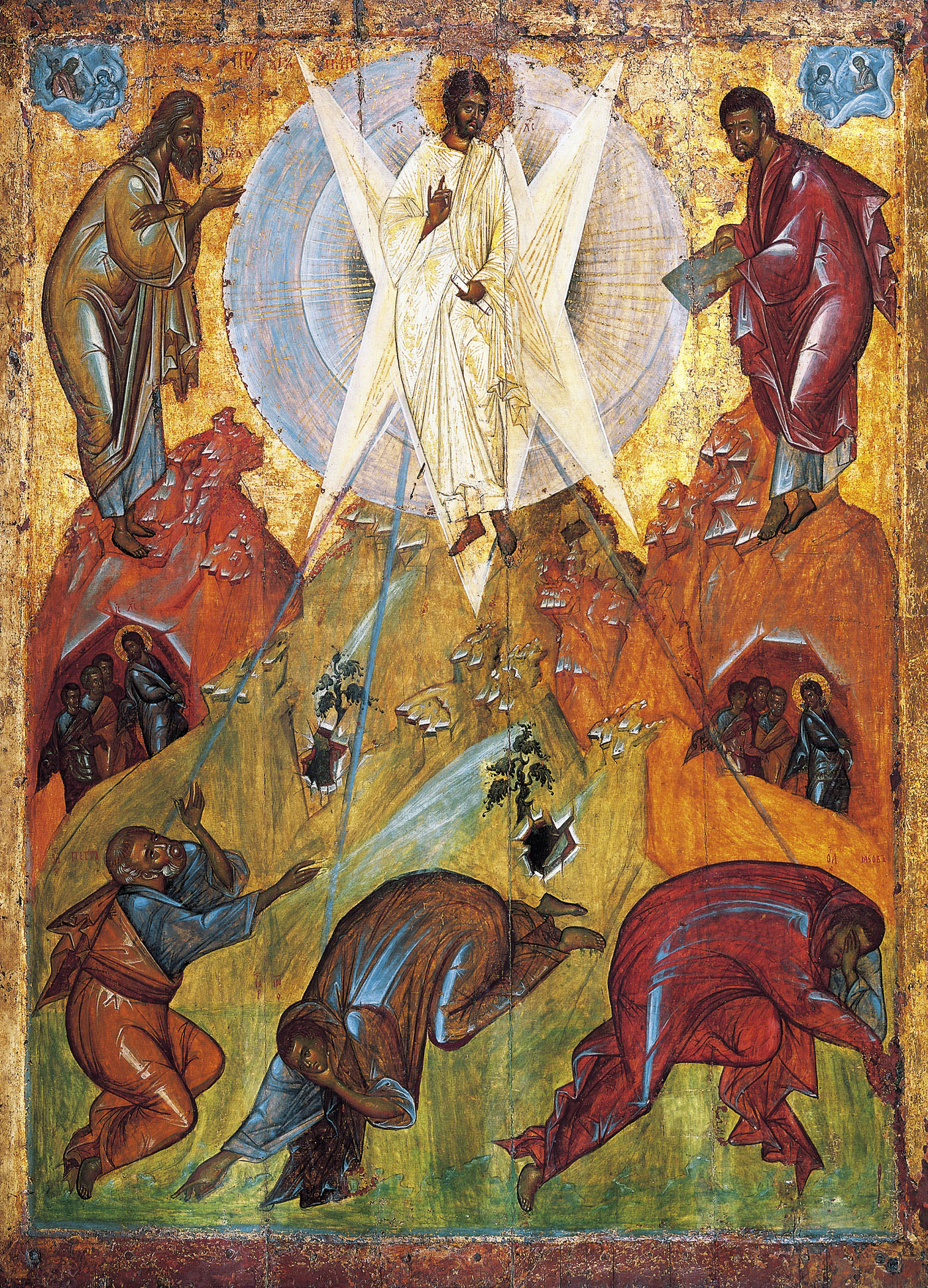
- Icon of the Transfiguration by Theophanes the Greek, 15th century
- Observed by: Christians
- Significance: Transfiguration of Jesus
- Date: 6 August
- Frequency: Annual

The Feast of the Transfiguration is celebrated by various churches, celebrating the transfiguration of Jesus and the testimony of Christ as the one in whom the law and the prophets are fulfilled. The origins of the feast are less than certain and may have derived from the dedication of three basilicas on Mount Tabor. The feast was present in various forms by the 9th century, and in the Western Church was made a universal feast celebrated on 6 August by Pope Callixtus III to commemorate the raising of the siege of Belgrade (1456).

In the Syriac Orthodox, Malankara Orthodox, Revised Julian calendars within Eastern Orthodoxy, Catholic, Old Catholic, and Anglican churches, the Feast of the Transfiguration is observed on 6 August. In the Armenian Apostolic Church, the Feast of the Transfiguration is observed on the fourteenth Sunday after Easter. In some Lutheran traditions preceding the reforms to the liturgy in the 1970s, 6 August was also observed as the Feast of the Transfiguration. In those Orthodox churches which continue to follow the Julian Calendar, 6 August falls on 19 August of the Gregorian Calendar. The Transfiguration is considered a major feast, numbered among the twelve Great Feasts in Byzantine Catholicism and Orthodoxy. In all these churches, if the feast falls on a Sunday, its liturgy is not combined with the Sunday liturgy, but completely replaces it.

The transfiguration can also be remembered at other points in the liturgical year, sometimes in addition to the feast itself. In the ancient western lectionary, the Ember Saturday in Lent included the gospel of the Transfiguration. In the Catholic lectionary, on the second Sunday in Lent the gospel of the Transfiguration is read. In the Lutheran Church of Sweden and the Church of Finland, the story is read on the seventh Sunday after Trinity, the eighth Sunday after Pentecost. In the Revised Common Lectionary, followed by some Lutherans, Anglicans, Methodists and others, the last Sunday in the Epiphany season (that immediately preceding Ash Wednesday) uses the gospel account, which has led some churches without established festal calendars to refer to this day as "Transfiguration Sunday".

== Byzantine Catholic and Eastern Orthodox churches ==
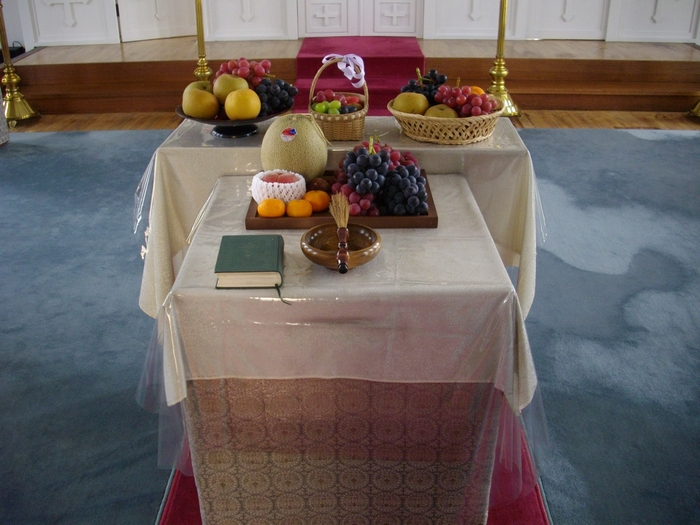
First Fruits brought to be blessed on the Feast of the Transfiguration (Japanese Orthodox Church)

In the Byzantine Catholic and Eastern Orthodox Churches, the Transfiguration falls during the Dormition Fast, but in recognition of the feast the fast is relaxed somewhat and the consumption of fish, wine and oil is allowed on this day.

In the Byzantine view the Transfiguration is not only a feast in honor of Jesus, but a feast of the Holy Trinity, for all three Persons of the Trinity are interpreted as being present at that moment: God the Father spoke from heaven; God the Son was the one being transfigured, and God the Holy Spirit was present in the form of a cloud. In this sense, the transfiguration is also considered the "Small Epiphany" (the "Great Epiphany" being the Baptism of Jesus, when the Holy Trinity appeared in a similar pattern).

The Transfiguration is ranked as one of the Twelve Great Feasts of the Byzantine liturgical calendar, and is celebrated with an All-Night Vigil beginning on the eve of the Feast.

Grapes are traditionally brought to church to be blessed after the Divine Liturgy on the day of the Transfiguration. If grapes are not available in the area, apples or some other fruit may be brought. This begins the "Blessing of First Fruits" for the year (in the Western Churches—Catholic, Lutheran and Anglican, the first fruits are blessed on Lammas).

The Transfiguration is the second of the "Three Feasts of the Saviour in August", the other two being the Procession of the Cross on 1 August and the icon of Christ not made by jand on 16 August. The Transfiguration is preceded by a one-day Forefeast and is followed by an Afterfeast of eight days, ending the day before the Forefeast of the Dormition.

In Byzantine theology, the Tabor Light is the light revealed on Mount Tabor at the Transfiguration of Jesus, identified with the light seen by Paul on the road to Damascus.

== Armenian Apostolic Church ==
The Armenian Apostolic Church celebrates the feast of the transfiguration (Պայծառակերպութիւն in Armenian) on the fourteenth Sunday after Easter. It is one of the five major feasts in the Armenian Church calendar. It is also called Vardavar (Վարդավառ or rose festival), a pagan celebration that the observance of the transfiguration officially replaced but some of whose customs and traditions are still observed by Christian Armenians and Muslim Hemshin people.

== Coptic Catholic and Orthodox churches ==
The Coptic Orthodox Church Celebrates the feast of transfiguration on the 13th of Mesri according to the Coptic calendar (i.e. 6 August O.S. or 19 August N.S.). The Transfiguration always falls during St Mary's Fast so it is observed as a fasting feast. The feast is considered one of the seven minor Feasts of the Lord, and is celebrated in the joyful tune.

== Ethiopian Catholic and Orthodox churches ==
The Ethiopian Orthodox Church holds the ceremony of Buhe on the Feast of the Transfiguration.

== Roman Catholic Church ==
In the Roman Catholic Church, the Transfiguration was once celebrated locally in various parts of the Catholic world on different days, including 6 August, but was not universally recognized. In 1456, the Kingdom of Hungary repulsed an Ottoman invasion of the Balkans by breaking the siege of Belgrade. News of the victory arrived in Rome on 6 August. Given the importance to international politics at that time of such battles between Christian and Muslim nations, in celebration of the victory, Pope Callixtus III elevated the Transfiguration to a Feast day to be celebrated in the entire Roman rite.

In 2002, Pope John Paul II selected the Transfiguration as one of the Luminous Mysteries ("... qui transfiguratus est") of the rosary.

== Old Catholic Church ==
The Old Catholic Church celebrates the Transfiguration typically on 6 August, according to the Roman rite calendar; however, every local Old Catholic Church throughout the world has the option to celebrate this major feast on a different day. The Old Catholic theological view of the Transfiguration shares much in common with the Eastern Orthodox perspective. Old Catholics also believe that the transfiguration was a major event that revealed the divinity of Christ; that Jesus is indeed the splendor and eikon of the Father. The Transfiguration shows forth humanity in the splendor of its original form when it was united in the life-giving love of the Triune God. This event reveals the possibility of humanity's theosis.

== Lutheran churches ==
The Evangelical Lutheran Church in America, Lutheran Church–Missouri Synod, the Evangelical Lutheran Church in Canada, and the North American Lutheran Church (NALC) observe the Feast of the Transfiguration as the last Sunday after the Epiphany. In the three-year lectionary, this is the Sunday immediately preceding Ash Wednesday and the season of Lent, but for parishes following the historic one-year lectionary, Transfiguration is the Sunday before Septuagesima, which marks the start of pre-Lent.

== Anglican Communion ==
In the Book of Common Prayer (1549 and 1552) the feast of the Transfiguration, which had a relatively low rank in the Sarum Calendar, is omitted, but was restored to the Calendar without a collect and reading being provided by royal order in 1560. This state of affairs is perpetuated in the 1662 Prayer Book, but would have been remedied had the 1928 Proposed BCP been approved by Parliament. As it was, the Bishops of the Church of England refused to sanction those who used the 1928 Book of Common Prayer as the 6 August date came into general use. The Feast of the Transfiguration is retained in the Common Worship lectionary of the Church of England (6 August). The American Book of Common Prayer of 1892 has been incorporated into most modern Anglican calendars (sometimes called "The Transfiguration of Our Lord").

The Book of Common Prayer of the American Episcopal Church lists the feast of The Transfiguration of Our Lord as occurring on August 6.

== Continental Reformed, Presbyterian, Congregationalist ==
In the Presbyterian Church, the Sunday of the Transfiguration marks the last day of the Epiphany season, on the last Sunday before Ash Wednesday. The inceptive Calvinist tradition rejected all liturgical feasts, including the Feast of the Transfiguration. This, however, does not mean that the Transfiguration itself was ignored by the Calvinists. Calvin's own views on the Transfiguration were far from ambivalent:

"It might be asked whether it was really Moses and Elijah who were present or whether only their spectres were set before the disciples, just as often the prophets saw visions of absent things. Although there is much to be said on both sides, as they say, it seems more likely to me that they really were brought to that place."

With time, most major feasts were restored to the Reformed ecclesiastical calendar. The Sunday of Transfiguration is now a part of the Revised Common Lectionary. Whether it is celebrated liturgically or in name only, it is left to the discretion of the clergy or Session.

The Book of Common Worship of 1993 (Presbyterian Church USA) contains the order of the service for Transfiguration of the Lord. This order is either combined with the Sunday liturgy or replaces it in those congregations which orient themselves towards liturgical practices and observances.

== See also ==
- Feast of the Ascension
- Ministry of Jesus
- Miracles of Jesus
- Transfiguration of Jesus in Christian art
