= Transfiguration of Christ (Bellini) =

15th-century painting by Giovanni Bellini in the Capodimonte Gallery

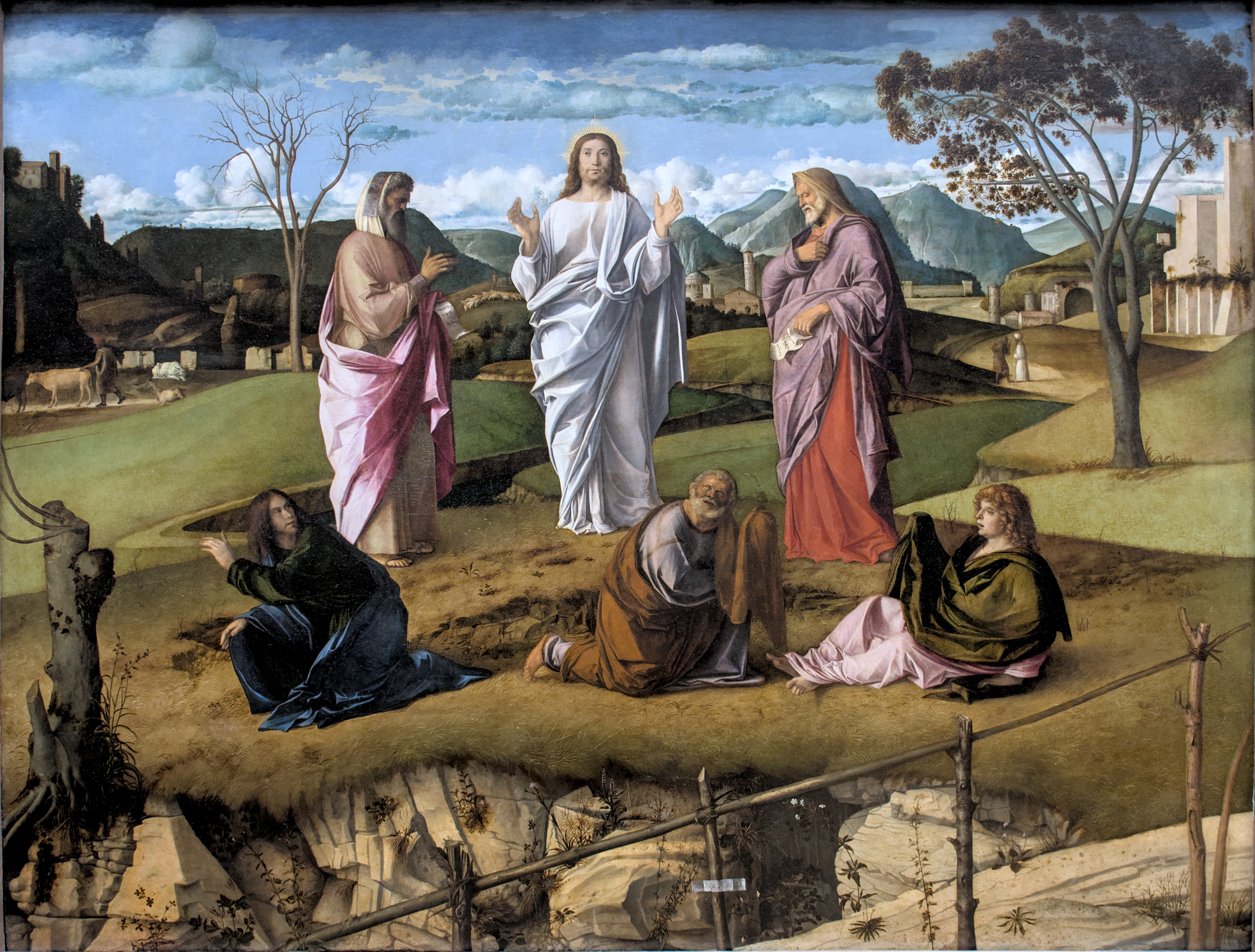
- Artist: Giovanni Bellini
- Year: c. 1480
- Medium: Oil on panel
- Dimensions: 116 cm × 154 cm (46 in × 61 in)
- Location: Museo di Capodimonte, Naples

Transfiguration of Christ is a c.1480 oil-on-panel painting of the Gospel episode the Transfiguration of Jesus by the Italian Renaissance master Giovanni Bellini, now in the Capodimonte Museum in Naples, Italy.

By this time Bellini had abandoned Gothic art and outgrown the influence of Mantegna. The picture shows a more relaxed style than his earlier Transfiguration. The work is signed IOANNES BELLINUS on a small chart hanging from the fence in the foreground. The leaves of the tree on the right, as well as the faces of James and Peter, are from a later restoration.

== See also ==
- List of works by Giovanni Bellini
