= Transfiguration (Lotto) =

Painting by Lorenzo Lotto

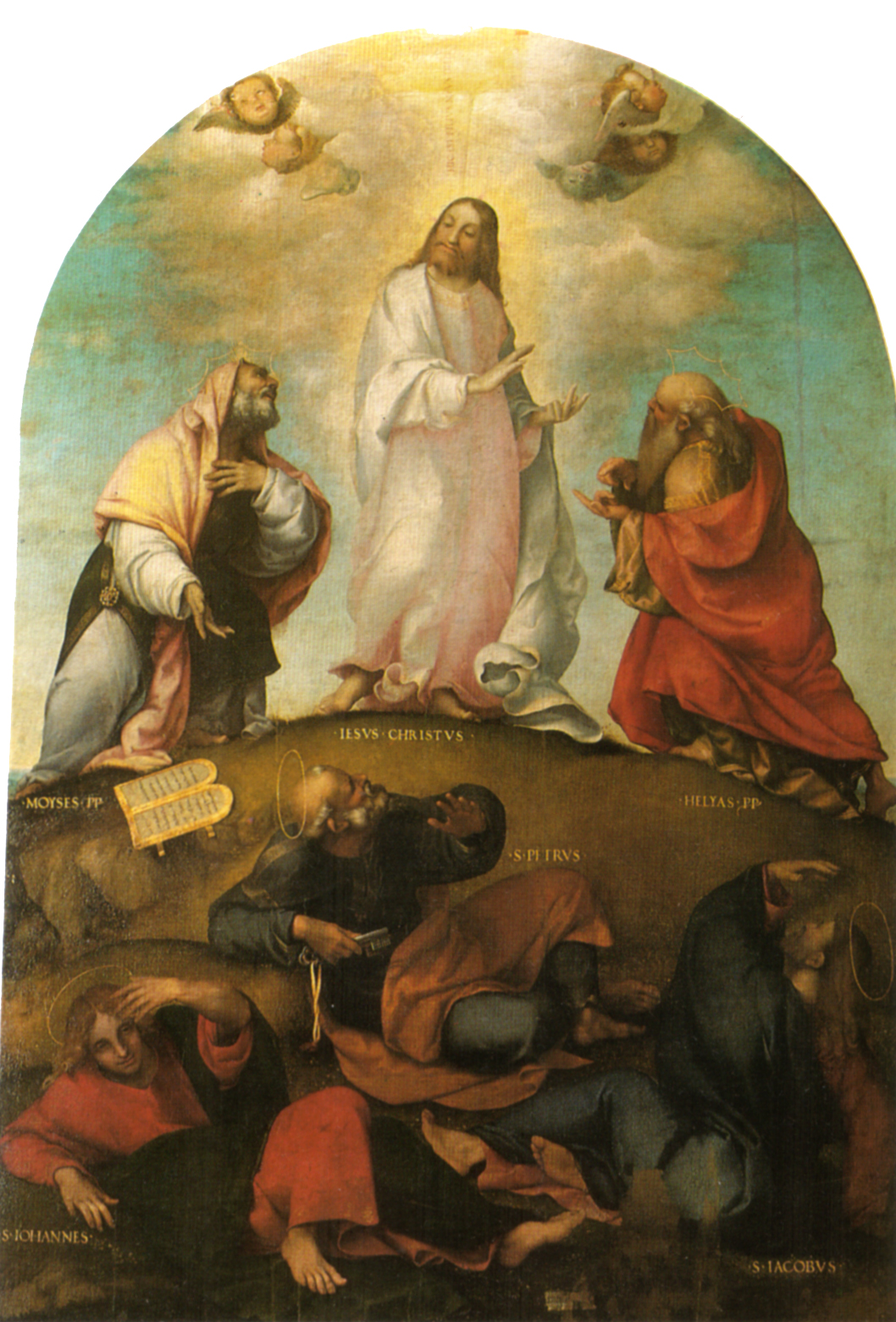
Transfiguration (1510–1512) by Lorenzo Lotto

Transfiguration is a signed oil-on-panel painting of the Gospel episode the Transfiguration of Jesus by Lorenzo Lotto, produced in 1510–1512 for the church of Santa Maria di Castelnuovo and now in the Museo civico Villa Colloredo Mels in Recanati. It may originally have had a predella, part of which is Christ Leading the Apostles to Mount Tabor (Hermitage Museum).

Lotto almost certainly stopped at Perugia en route between Rome and the Marche. There he would have seen Perugino's frescoes for the audience chambers of the Collegio del Cambio. Whilst there Lotto also painted a Deposition; both that and Transfiguration show signs of an experimental style he abandoned after his 1513 move to Bergamo.
