= Transfiguration (Rubens) =

C. 1605 painting by Pierre-Paul Rubens

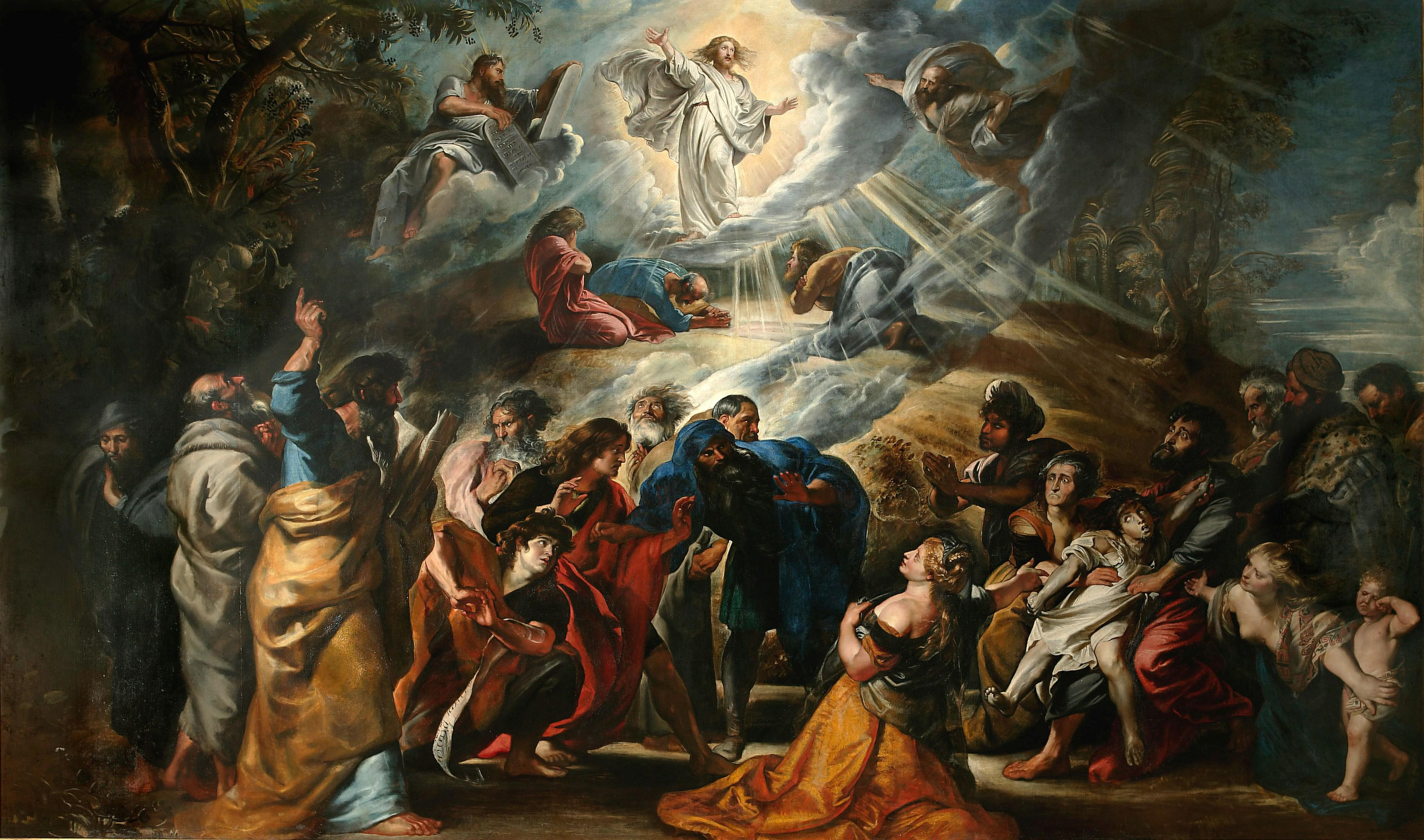
Transfiguration (1604–1605) by Rubens

Transfiguration is an oil-on-canvas painting of the Gospel episode the Transfiguration of Jesus, painted in 1604–1605 by Peter Paul Rubens and now in the Musée des Beaux-Arts de Nancy.
