= Transfiguration (Bellini, Venice) =

Painting by Giovanni Bellini

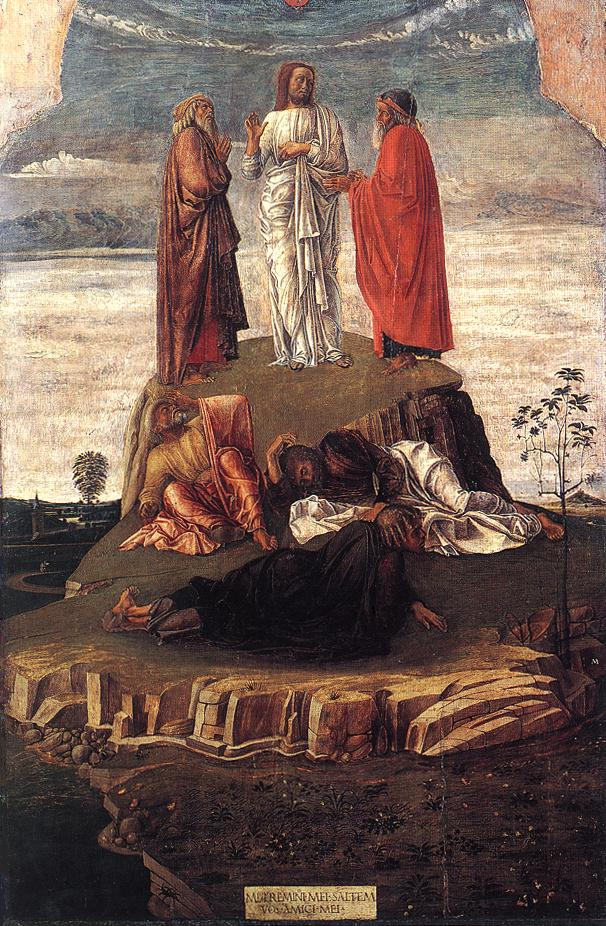
- Artist: Giovanni Bellini
- Year: c. 1454-1460
- Medium: tempera on panel
- Dimensions: 116 cm × 154 cm (46 in × 61 in)
- Location: Museo Correr, Venice

The Transfiguration is a tempera-on-panel painting by Italian painter Giovanni Bellini, created c. 1454–1460. It depicts the Gospel episode the Transfiguration of Jesus. It is held in the Museo Correr in Venice.

Andrea Mantegna was staying in the city of Venice at this time and his influence on Bellini was still strong at this time, as can be seen in this work. A fake set of initials in the lower right hand corner even led it to be misattributed to Mantegna for a time. Its provenance is unknown before 1830 since by the time he left it to Venice that year Teodoro Correr had destroyed all the documents relating to its previous history and ownership.

It shows the Transfiguration on Mount Tabor, with Elijah and Moses flanking Christ; below them are the disciples Peter, James and John blinded by the vision.

== See also ==
- List of works by Giovanni Bellini
