= Teodoro Correr =

Venetian abbot and art collector

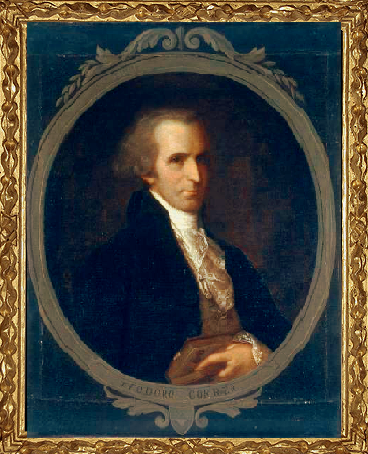
Bernardino Castelli, Portrait of Teodoro Correr

Teodoro Francesco Maria Gasparo Correr (12 December 1750, Venice – 20 February 1830, Venice) was a Venetian abbot and art collector, most notable as the founder of the Museo Correr.

== Life ==
The Correr were an old patrician family in Venice. Teodoro's father was Giacomo and his wife, the Neapolitan noblewoman Anna Maria Petagno, daughter of Andrea, from the princely family of Trebisaccia. Teodoro was the first of nine brothers and aged ten was sent to school with the Theatines at San Nicola da Tolentino. He only stayed there a year before moving to the San Cipriano college on Murano, which he left aged twenty-one in 1771. Even as a youth he became interested in collecting objects and artworks relating to Venice and its history.

When they reached twenty-five all Venetian patricians were required to take up minor magistracies and Correr reluctantly followed suit. In 1775 he entered the Great Council of Venice and the same year was elected savio agli ordini. The following year he was made provveditore alle pompe and in 1778 he was re-elected savio and made provveditore di Comun. In 1787 he was elected podestà and captain of Treviso, but he immediately gained dispensation from taking up this office. In 1788 he became podestà and procurator at Verona. He only half-heartedly held public office and finally eschewed it altogether by becoming an abbot in 1789. He even declined to serve in the Civic Guard on health grounds during the Fall of the Republic of Venice in 1797 and instead paid a cash fine in monthly installments.

After his parents died, he was able to commit himself to collecting full-time, though he had already begun forming a collection of paintings, relics and documents relating to Venetian history whilst still a young man. His collecting peaked during the years immediately after the Republic's fall and the resulting decision by many patrician families to sell off their whole art collections. Despite his limited means, he used his connections to other patrician families to buy and exchange paintings, coins, archaeology. majolica, glassware, books, engravings, gems, enamels, medals, curiosities, weapons, antiquities, bronzes and manuscripts. He installed his growing collection in his family palazzo in the San Giovanni Decollato district of the Santa Croce sestiere.

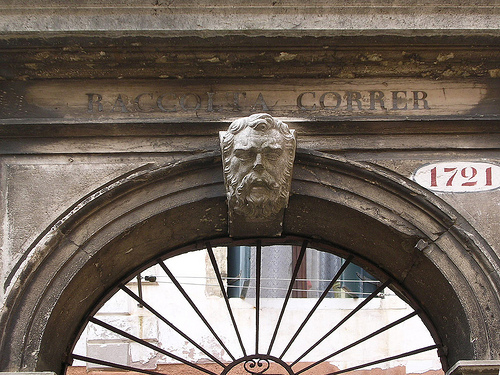
Entrance to the Museo Correr.

In old age he wondered how to ensure his collection stayed together after his death, rather than being dispersed by his brother. He wrote his will on 1 January 1830, stipulating:

his house ... by S. Giovanni Decollato, where the Museum must be kept, must take on the name of the Correr Collection; it is to be open to the public at least two days a week ... [he leaves] all his movable and immovable belongings, actions, reasons, credits to fund this public institution, which he puts under the protection of the City of Venice

This marked the beginning of Venice's city museums and formed the foundation stone for the current museum network in the city. Correr's collection formed the nucleus for the present-day Museo Correr, which moved in 1879 to the neighbouring Fondaco dei Turchi (now the Museo di Storia Naturale) then to the former Palazzo Reale (or Procuratie Nuovissime) on Piazza San Marco in 1922, where it still remains.

== Selected works from the Correr collection ==
- Embriachi workshop, Wedding Chest, mid 14th - early 15th centuries
- Pisanello, First medal of Lionello d'Este, 1441
- Matteo de' Pasti, Medal of Sigismondo Pandolfo Malatesta and Castel Sismondo, 1446
- Giovanni Bellini, Transfiguration, 1455-1460
- Giovanni Bellini, Crucifixion, circa 1455-1460
- Cosmè Tura, Pietà, 1460
- Antonello da Messina, The Dead Christ Supported By Three Angels, 1474-1476
- Gentile Bellini, Portrait of Doge Giovanni Mocenigo, 1480
- Vittore Carpaccio, Two Venetian Ladies, 1490
- Jacopo de' Barbari, View of Venezia MD, primi anni del 1500
- Nicola da Urbino, Maiolica service, 1515
