= Bernardino da Asola =

Italian painter

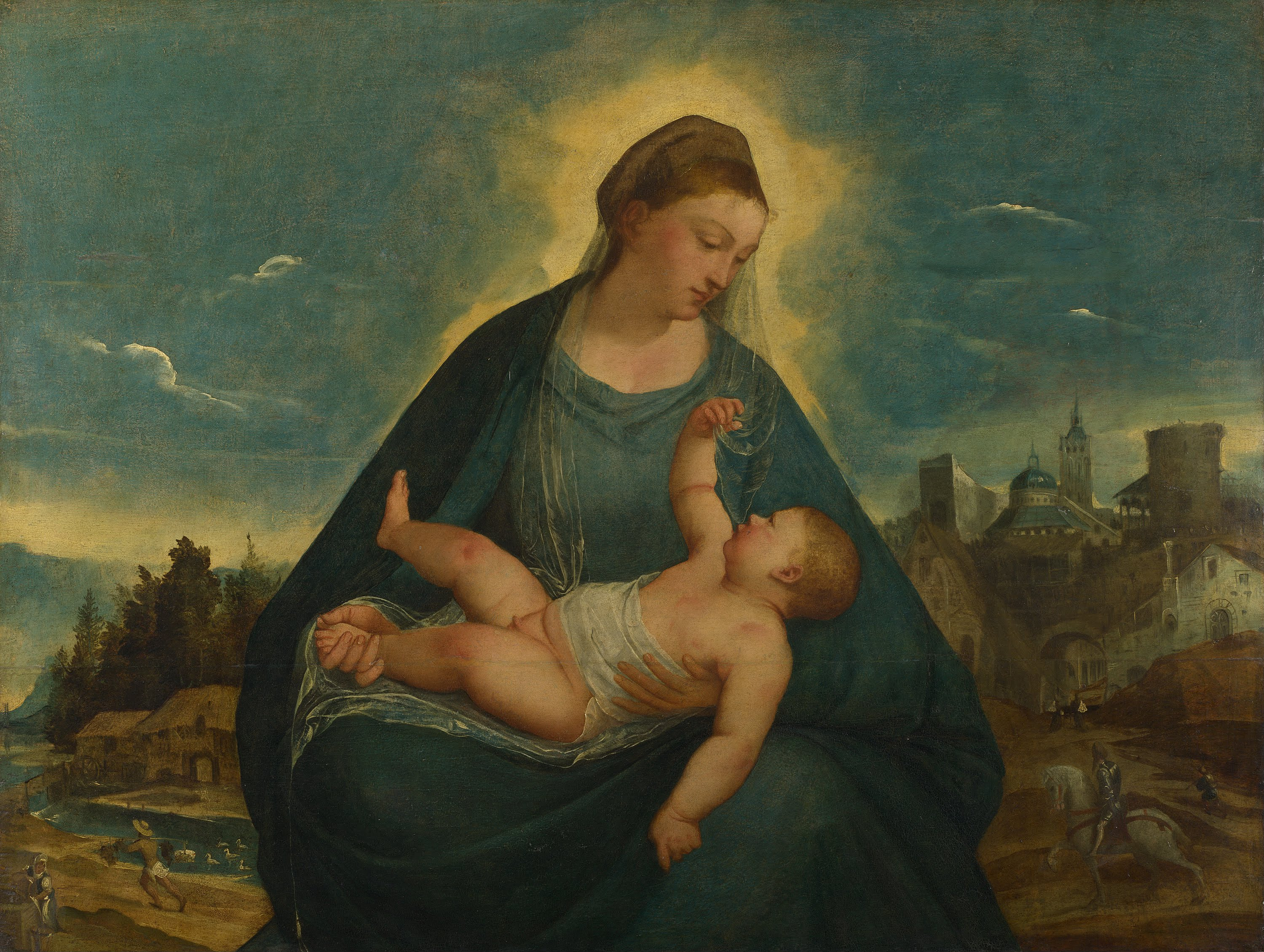
Madonna and Child

Bernardino da Asola (c.1490–1540) was a 16th-century Italian painter.

== Biography ==
He was born in Asola, Lombardy as the son of Giovanni da Asola or Giovanni da Brescia. He worked with his father on Duomo of Asola, Lombardy in 1518 and in 1526 he and his father painted a set of organ shutters for the San Michele in Murano (now in Museo Correr).

He died in Venice.
