= Frizzoni Madonna =

1460–1464 painting by Giovanni Bellini

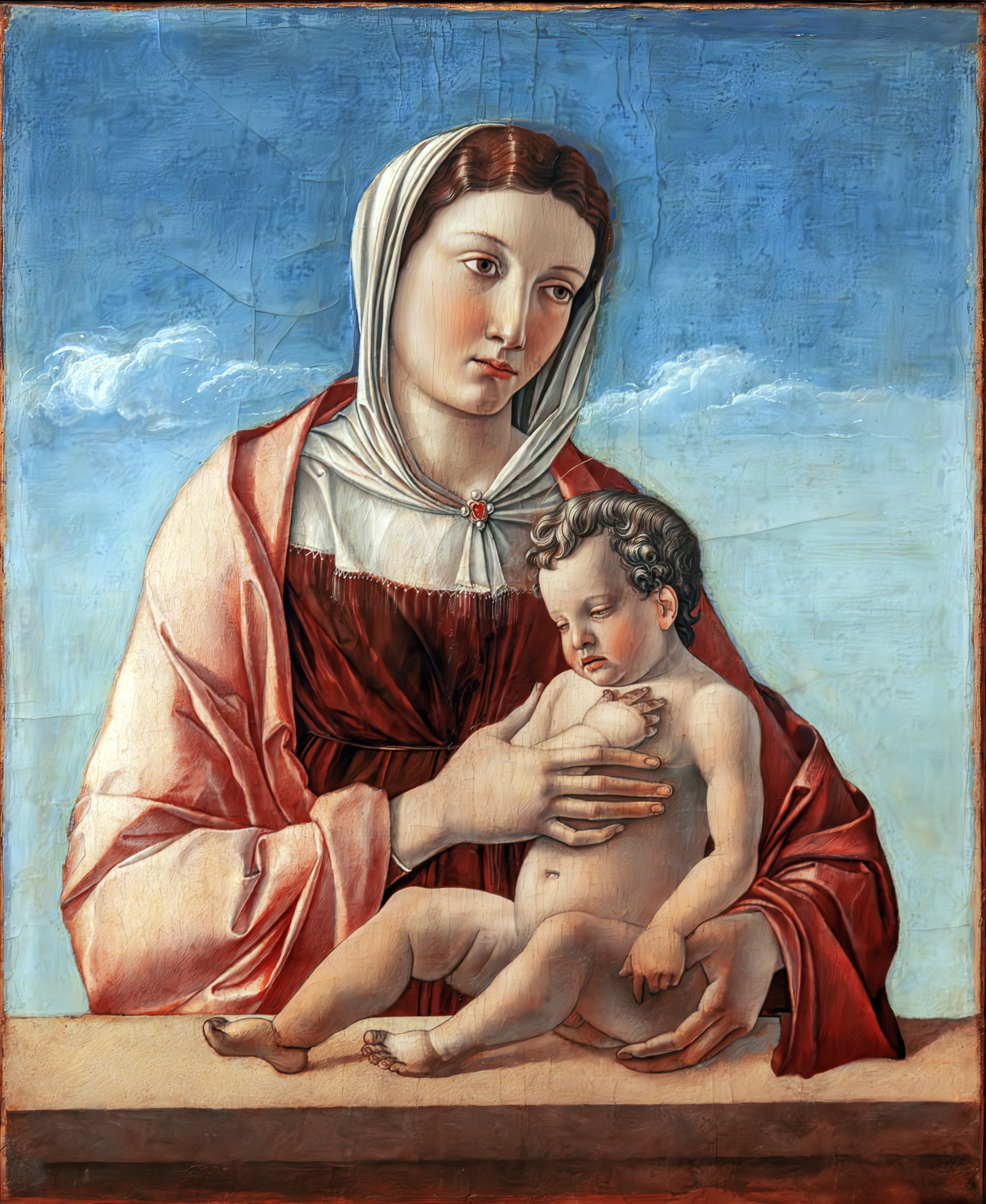
- Artist: Giovanni Bellini
- Year: 1460–1464
- Dimensions: 52 cm × 43 cm (20 in × 17 in)
- Location: Museo Correr, Venice

The Frizzoni Madonna is a 1460–1464 painting by the Italian Renaissance painter Giovanni Bellini. It was once part of the Frizzoni collection in Bergamo. It entered the Museo Correr in Venice in 1891, the same year as it was identified as a work by Bellini. It was originally an oil-on-wood painting, but it was transferred to canvas before entering the Museo Correr.

== See also ==
- List of works by Giovanni Bellini
