= Boldrini =

Boldrini is an Italian surname. Notable people with the surname include:

- Andrea Boldrini (1971), Italian racing driver
- Arrigo Boldrini (1915–2008), Italian politician and partisan
- Laura Boldrini (born 1961), Italian journalist and politician, president of the Chamber of Deputies in Italy
- Leonardo Boldrini (16th century), Italian Renaissance painter
- Marcello Boldrini (1890–1969), Italian statistician
- Niccolò Boldrini (c.1500–c.1566), Italian Renaissance engraver
