= Liberalis of Treviso =

Saint Liberalis
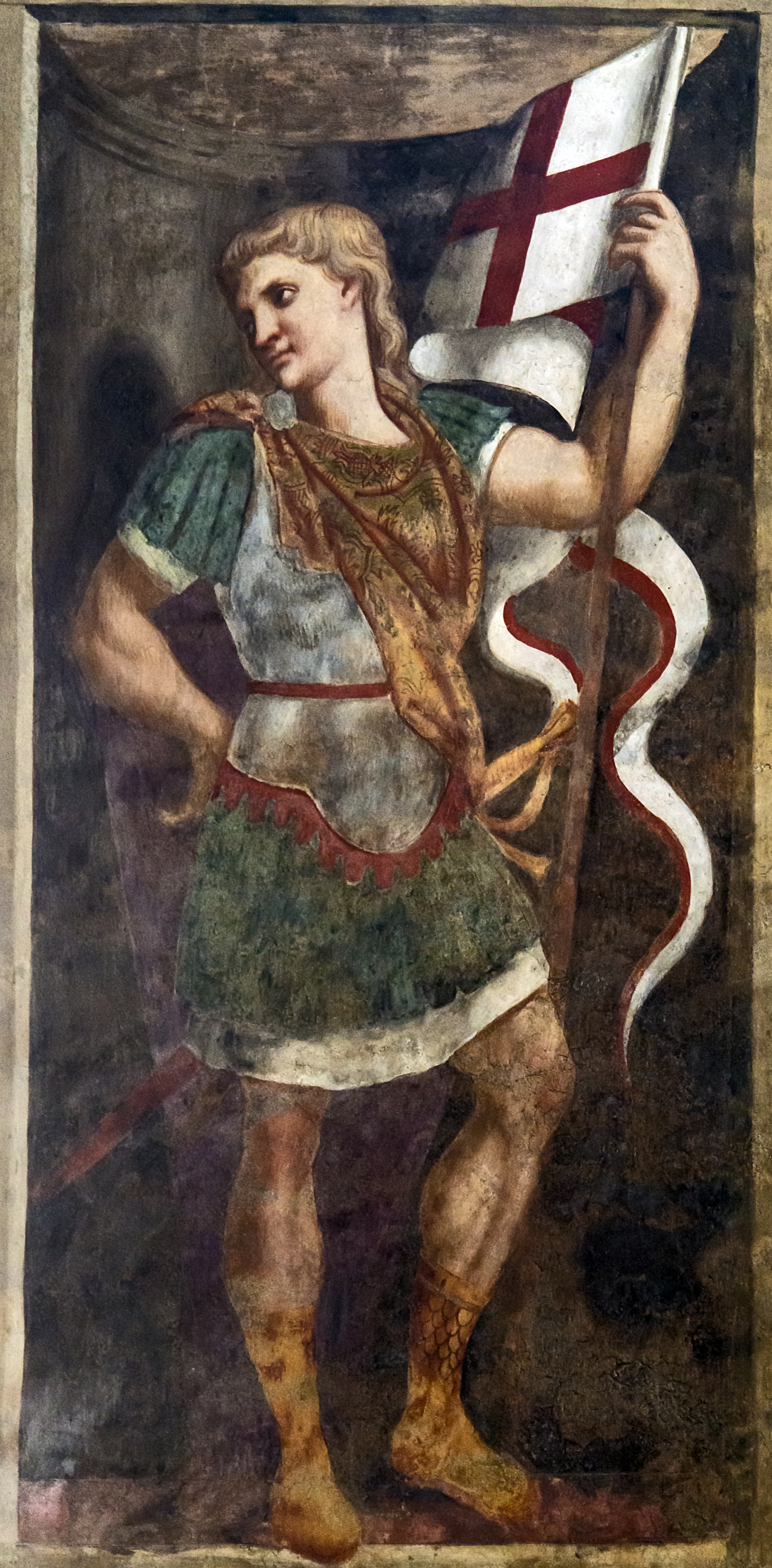
- Liberalis of Treviso by Pomponio Amalteo - Treviso Cathedral, ca. 1520
- Born: 4th century
- Died: 400
- Major shrine: Treviso
- Feast: April 27
- Attributes: depicted as a knight
- Patronage: Castelfranco Veneto

Another St. Liberalis was bishop of Embrun from 920-940. He died in 940 at Brive, his birthplace. It is also another name for Saint Eleutherius, venerated with Saint Antia.

Saint Liberalis of Treviso (Italian: San Liberale) is a saint of the 4th century. Tradition states that he was a priest who opposed Arianism and that he was persecuted at Ancona.

== Legend ==
A legend, composed around the 10th century and incorporating elements from other saints’ hagiographies, states that Liberalis was a native of Altinum, born to a noble equestrian family. According to the legend, he was educated in the Christian faith by Heliodorus of Altino (Eliodoro), first Christian bishop of the city. Liberalis practiced extreme mortifications and fasts after his conversion.

Faced with growing opposition from both Arianism and paganism in the see, Heliodorus retired as bishop and lived as a hermit on a desert island in the lagoons near Altino, entrusting the see to a man named Ambrose. Worried about Ambrose's ability to handle the rise of Arianism in the see, Liberalis decided to look for Heliodorus and attempt to convince him to come back to his see. On the way, Liberalis fell asleep in a church and experienced a strange dream, in which an angel, resplendent in white, encouraged him in his mission and also announced his imminent death. Liberalis traveled onward to Castrazone where there was a church dedicated to Saint Lawrence. He was unable to find a way to reach Heliodorus’ island and decided instead to lead the life of a hermit. However, he fell ill and died on April 27. He was buried in the Castrazone church in a marble sepulcher.

== Veneration ==
His relics were carried to Treviso from Altinum around 452 to safeguard them against the Hunnish invasions, or perhaps later, when the threat came from the Lombards rather than the Huns. Liberalis' relics may have been enshrined with those associated with the martyrs Theonistus, Tabra, and Tabratha (Teonisto, Tabra e Tabrata) at the cathedral of Torcello after 639 AD.

However, the presence of these martyrs’ relics in Treviso is also attested, and a strong cultus took hold there, with documentation attesting to the cultus dating from 1082 onwards. In the twelfth century, Liberalis was proclaimed patron saint of Treviso, and was patron of the cathedral, along with Saint Peter and Saint Paul. Liberalis became patron of Castelfranco Veneto as a result of the fact that citizens of Treviso founded that town in 1199.

In art he is either depicted with a dalmatic or in a soldier's cloak.

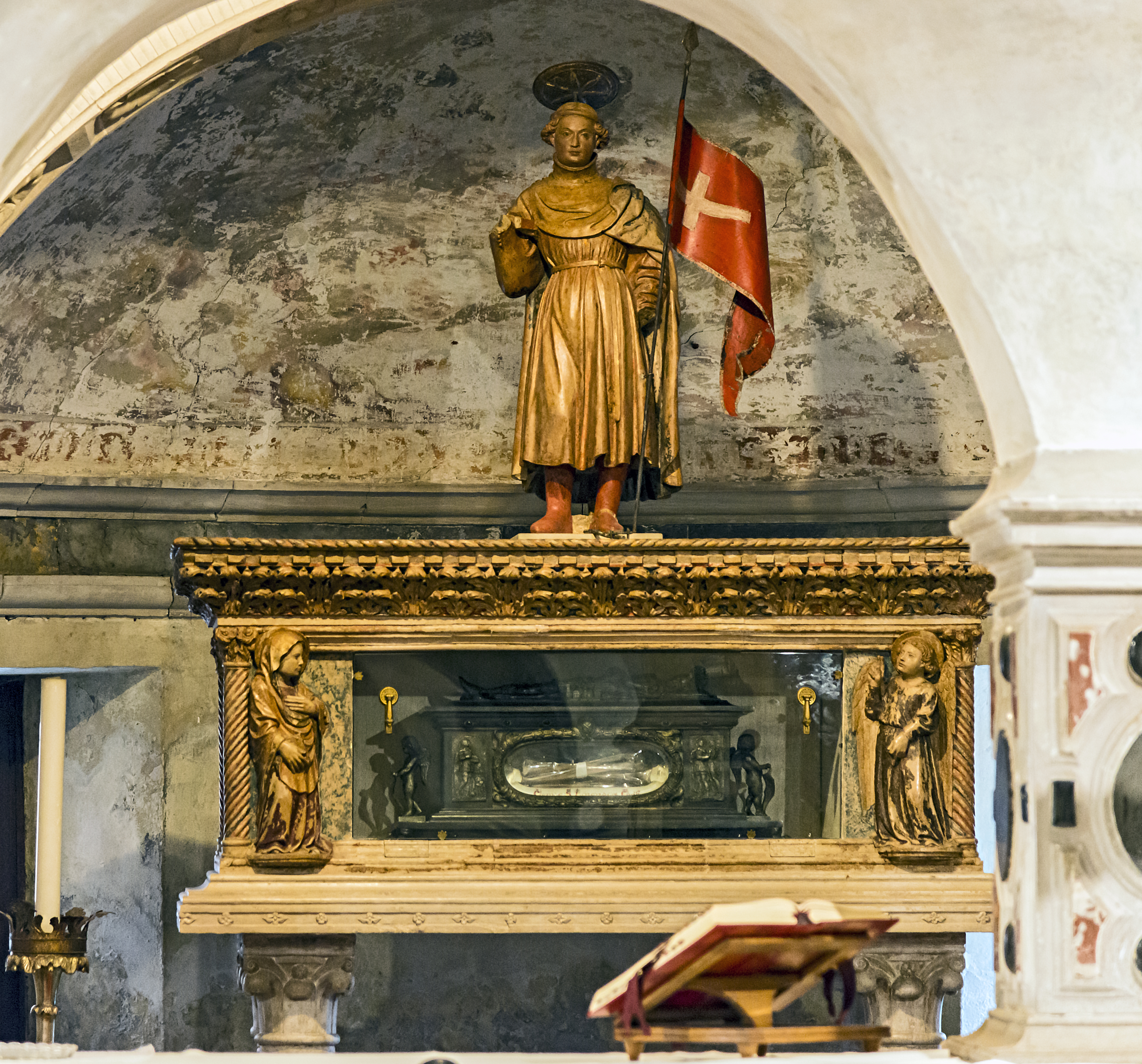
Reliquary of Liberalis of Treviso in Treviso Cathedral

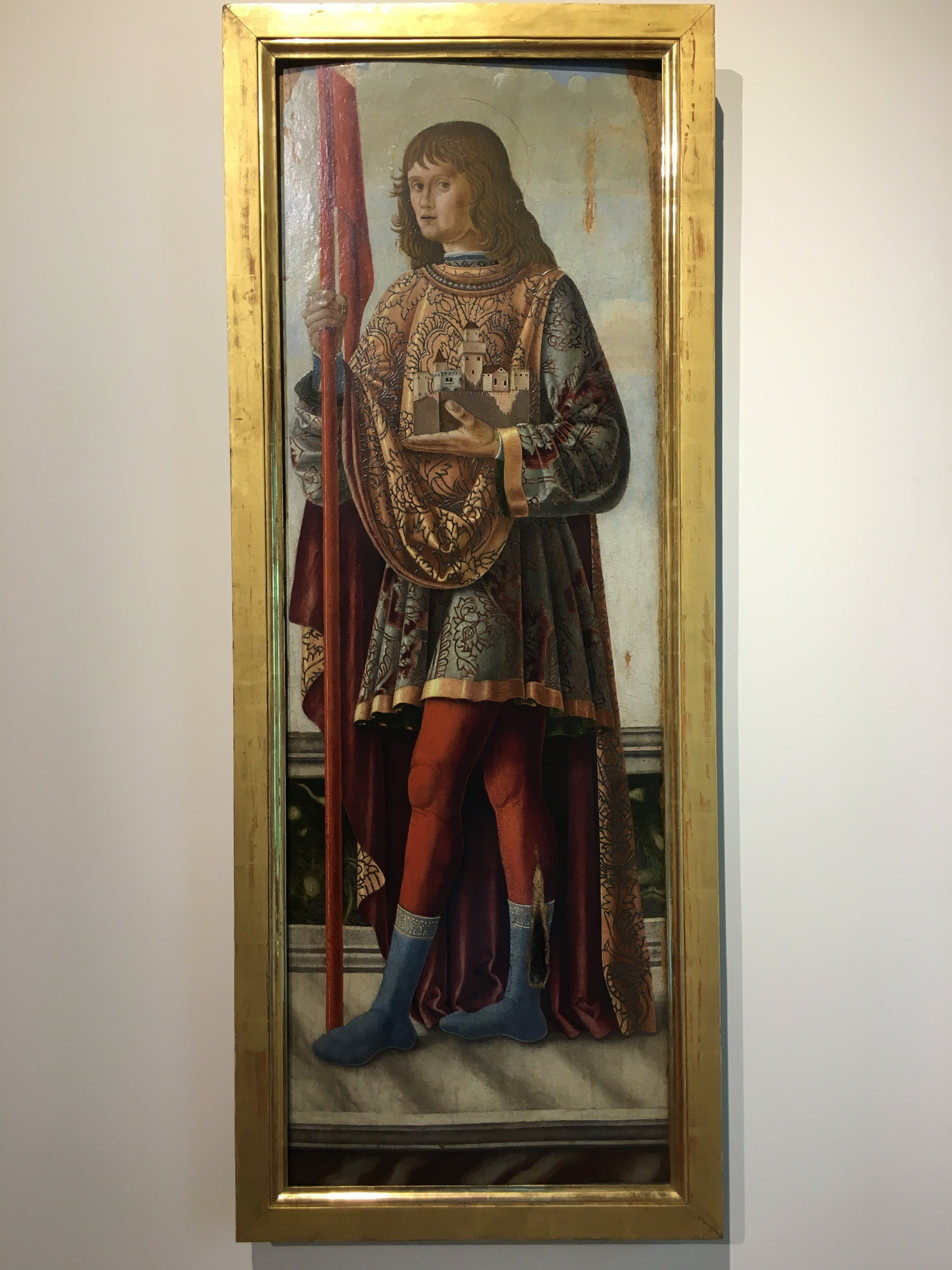
Leonardo Boldrini, 1475, Musée des Beaux-Arts de Dijon

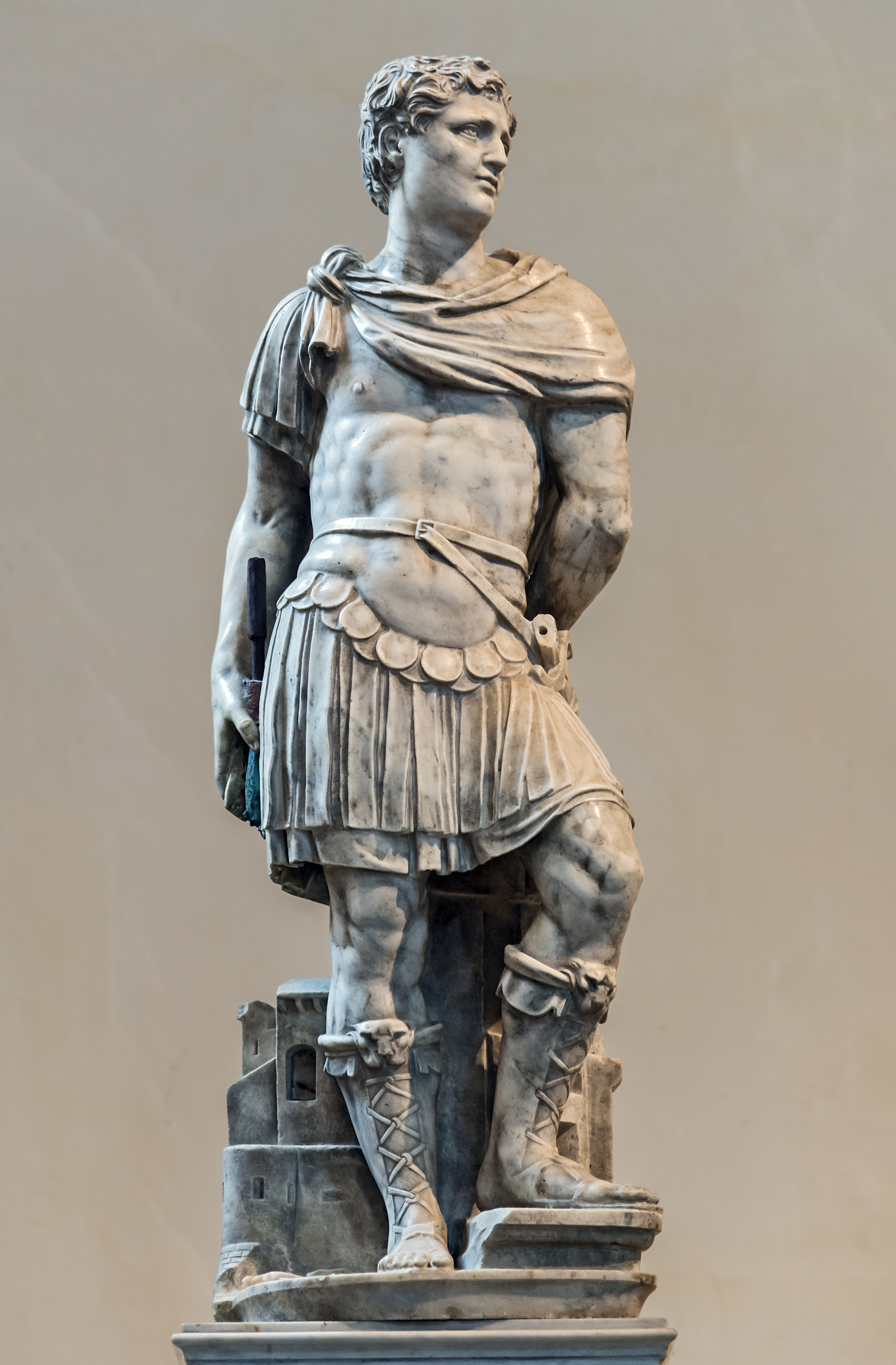
Marble statue, sixteenth century, Treviso Cathedral

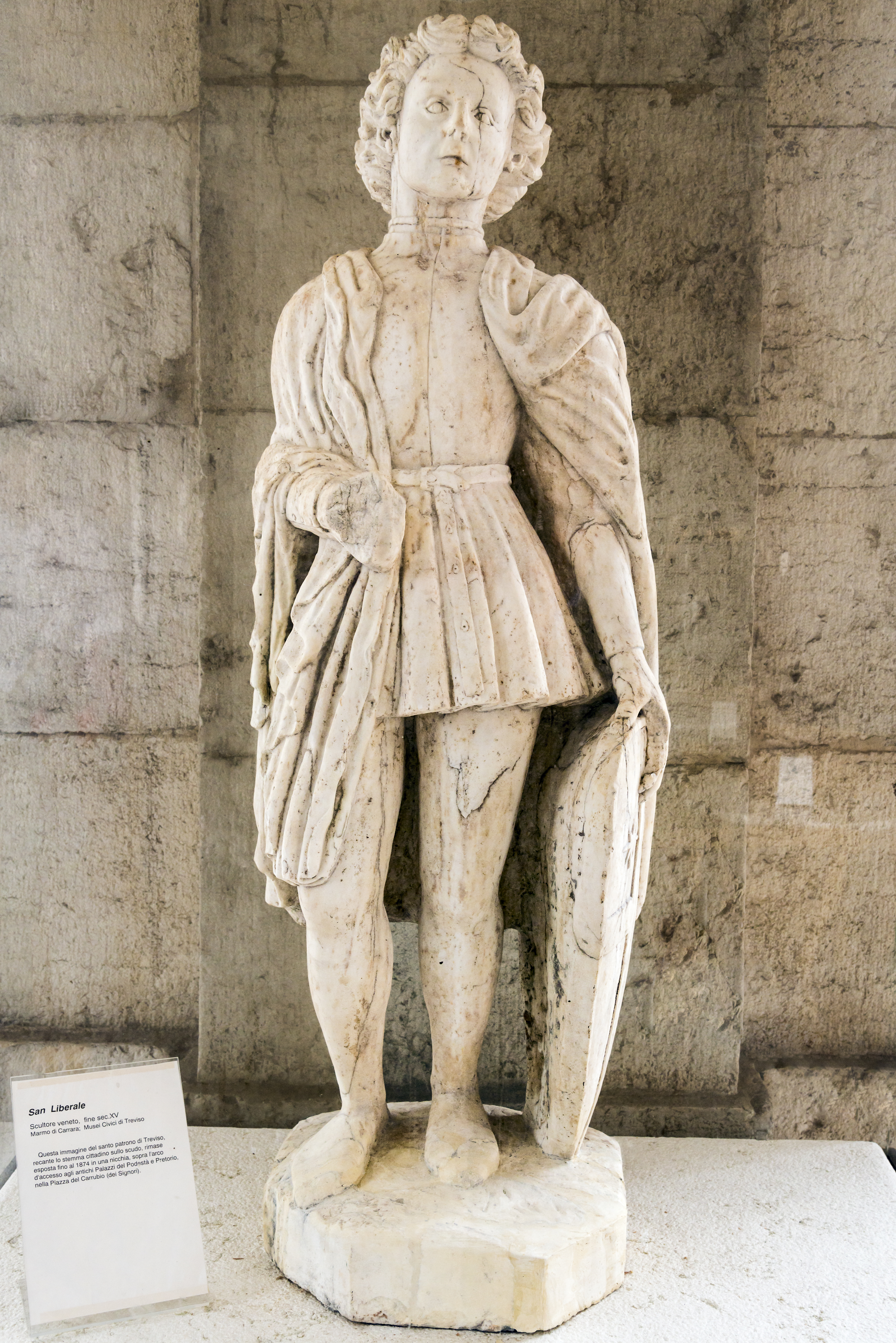
late fifteenth century, Civic Museums of Treviso

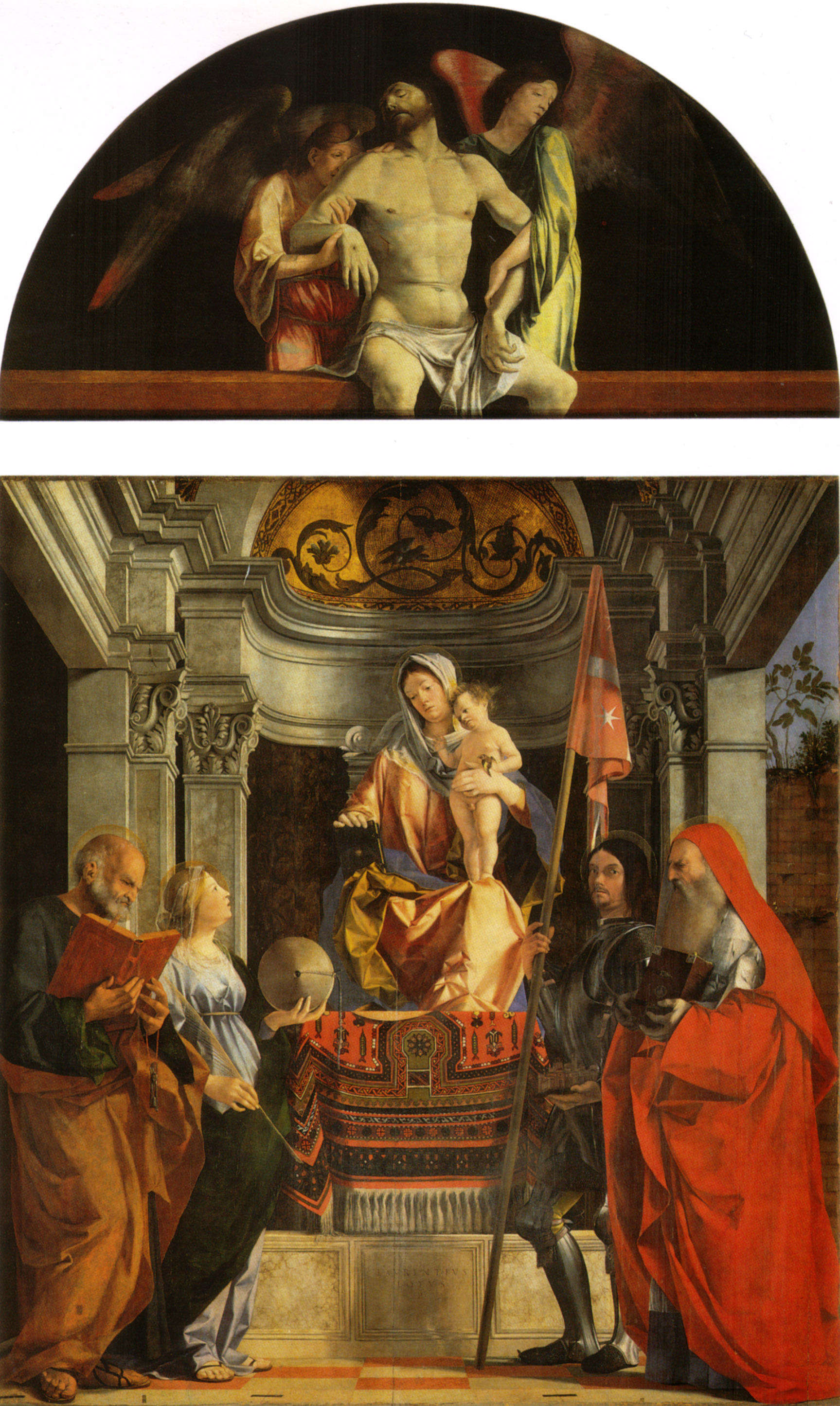
Lorenzo Lotto, Virgin Mary, Saint Peter, Saint Christina of Bolsena, Saint Liberalis and Saint Jerome.

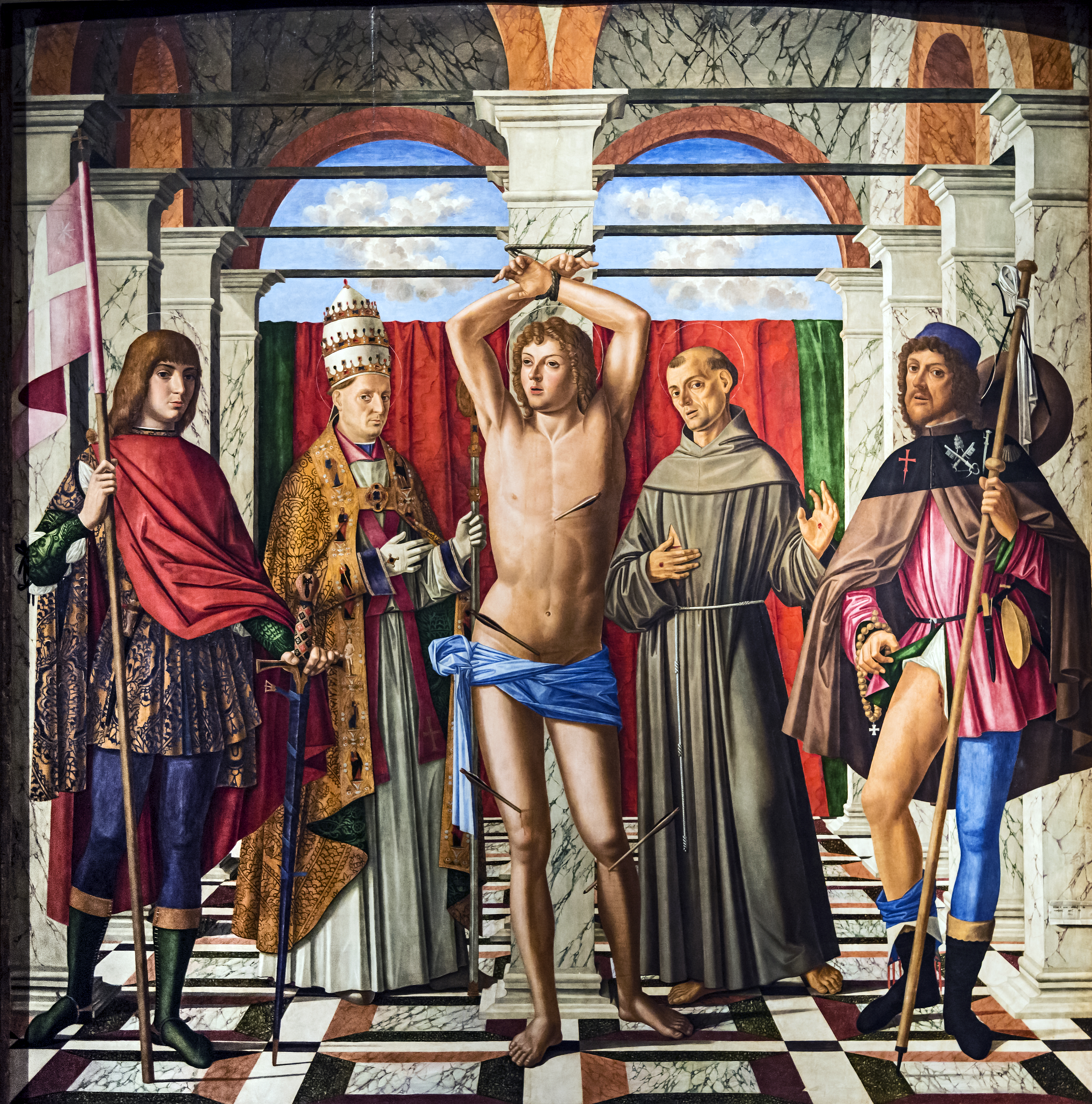
Giovanni Mansueti, Saint Sebastian and Saints Liberalis of Treviso, Francis of Assisi and Roch, 1494, Gallerie dell'Accademia

== Sources ==
- Saint Liberalis
- (in Italian) San Liberale
