= Giovanni da Asola =

Italian painter

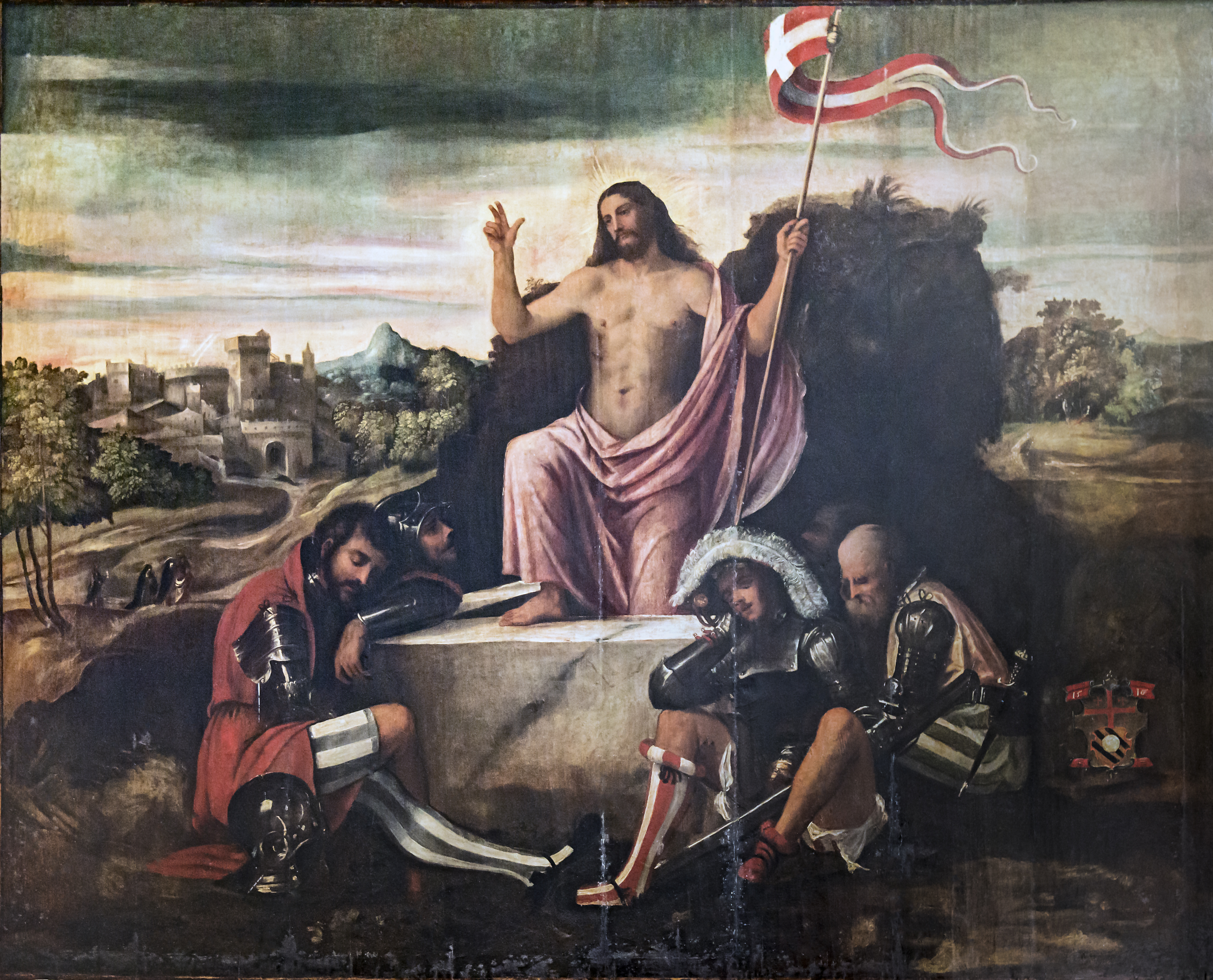
- The Resurrection of Christ - San Francesco della Vigna
- Born: Brescia, Lombardy
- Occupation: Painter
- Known for: Adoration of the Shepherds (1526)

Giovanni da Asola (active 1512 – 1530) was an Italian painter of the Renaissance, who along with his son Bernardino da Asola, were prominent in the Venice of the early 16th century. Born in Brescia, Giovanni appeared in Venice in 1512, probably contemporary with Girolamo Romanino. An Adoration of the Magi were painted for the Duomo of Asola in 1518. In 1526 he and his son painted a set of organ shutters for San Michele in Murano now in Museo Correr. He painted an Adoration of the Shepherds in 1526, now in the Museo Civico of Padua.
