= Torcello Cathedral =

Church in Venice, Italy

Coordinates: 45.4982°N 12.4193°E

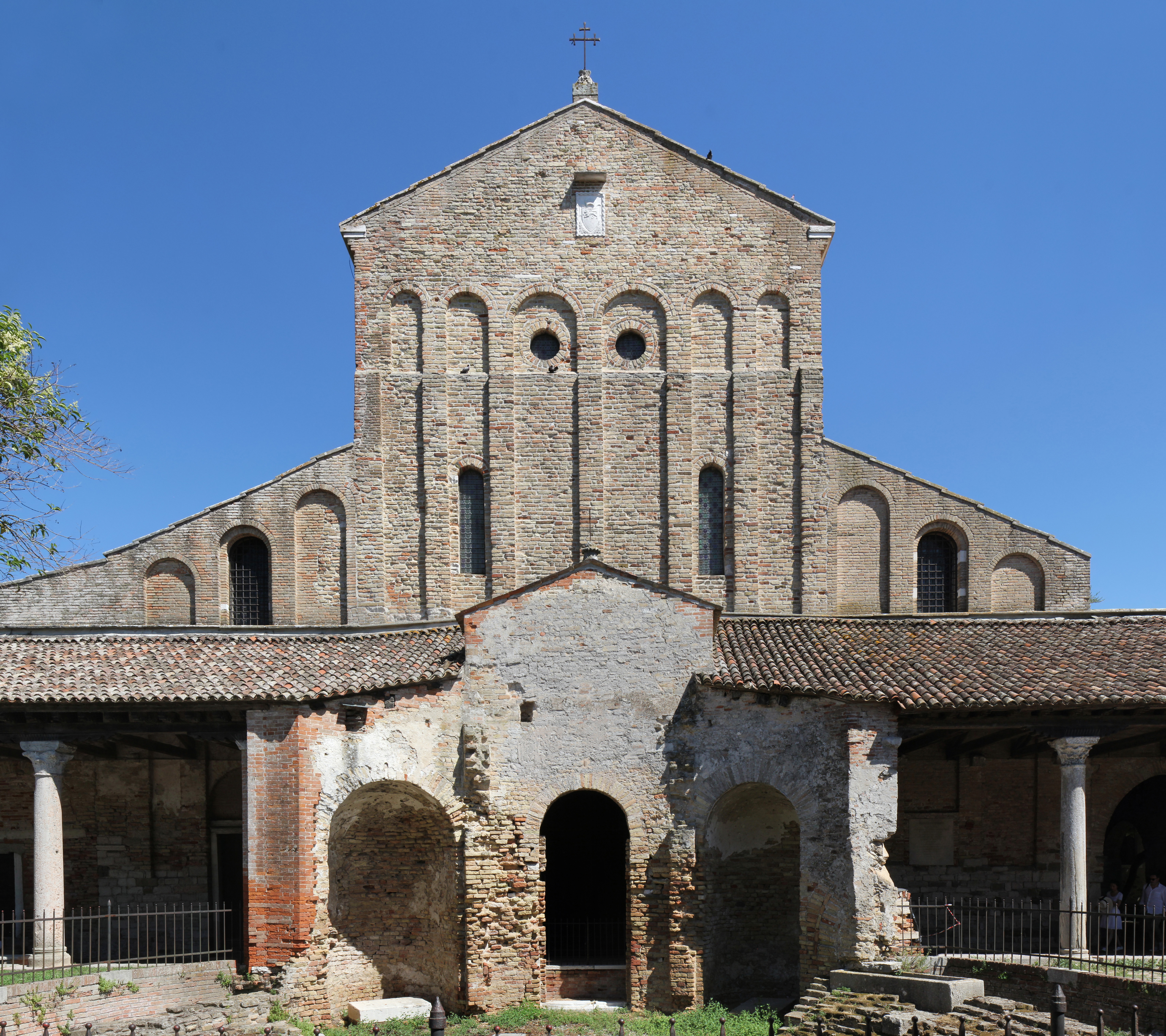
Church of Santa Maria Assunta, Torcello

The Church of Santa Maria Assunta (Italian: Basilica di Santa Maria Assunta) is a basilica church on the island of Torcello, Venice, northern Italy. It is a notable example of Late Paleochristian architecture, one of the most ancient religious edifices in the Veneto, and containing the earliest mosaics in the area of Venice. Former Cathedral of the Roman Catholic Diocese of Torcello.

== History ==
According to an ancient inscription, it was founded by the exarch Isaac of Ravenna in 639, when Torcello was still a rival to the young nearby settlement at Venice.

The original church is believed to have had a nave with one aisle on each side and a single apse on the eastern wall of the cathedral. It's difficult to tell what the original church was like because very little of it survived the subsequent renovations. Much of the plan of the original church survives as its present form is very similar to the original but the only physical parts that survive are the central apse wall and part of the baptistery that survives as part of the façade of the current church.

The first of two major renovations occurred in 864 under the direction of Bishop Adeodatus II. In this renovation, the two aisle apses that appear today were built. Also, the synthronon that fills the central apse was created and the crypt was placed under it. After this renovation, the cathedral would have resembled the current cathedral more than the original church would have but it is not until after the second and final major renovation that the cathedral appears very similar to its current design.

The final renovation was consecrated under Bishop Orso Orseolo, whose father Pietro Orseolo II was the Doge of Venice at the time, in 1008. With this renovation, Orseolo raised the nave, added windows to the western wall, and created the arcade that runs along the nave on both sides separating it from the aisles and helping to support the clerestory.

== Architecture ==
The façade is preceded by a narthex to which was once annexed the 7th century baptistry, only traces of which remain. On its side is the martyrion, dedicated to Santa Fosca. The bell tower dates from the 11th century. Also annexed was in origin the Bishop's Palace. The façade has 12 semi-columns connected by arches at the tops. The narthex (11th century) was enlarged in the 13th century. In the middle is the marble portal (1000).

The most striking exterior features are the decoration of the façade and the frontal portico, enlarged in the 14th century.

The interior, with a nave and two aisles, has a marble pavement, the throne of the bishops of Altino and the sepulchre of St. Heliodorus, first bishop of Altino. The counter-façade has a mosaic of the Universal Judgement. Noteworthy is also a mosaic depicting a Madonna with Child (of the Hodegetria type) in the middle apse (11th century).

== Mosaics ==
The most important artistic element of the cathedral is the mosaics, the earliest remaining mosaics in the neighbourhood of Venice. The main apse has an 11th-century mosaic of famous beauty of the standing Virgin Hodegetria, isolated against a huge gold background, above a register of standing saints. These seem originally late 11th-century, by a team of Byzantine mosaicists, but the main figure was reworked a century later after an earthquake, while the saints remain from the first period of work.

The west wall (over the door) was done in this second phase: from the top it contains a Crucifixion in the gable, then a vigorous Harrowing of Hell with a large figure of Christ, above a Last Judgement taking up four lower registers.

The skull of Saint Cecilia is also kept as a relic here.

== Gallery ==
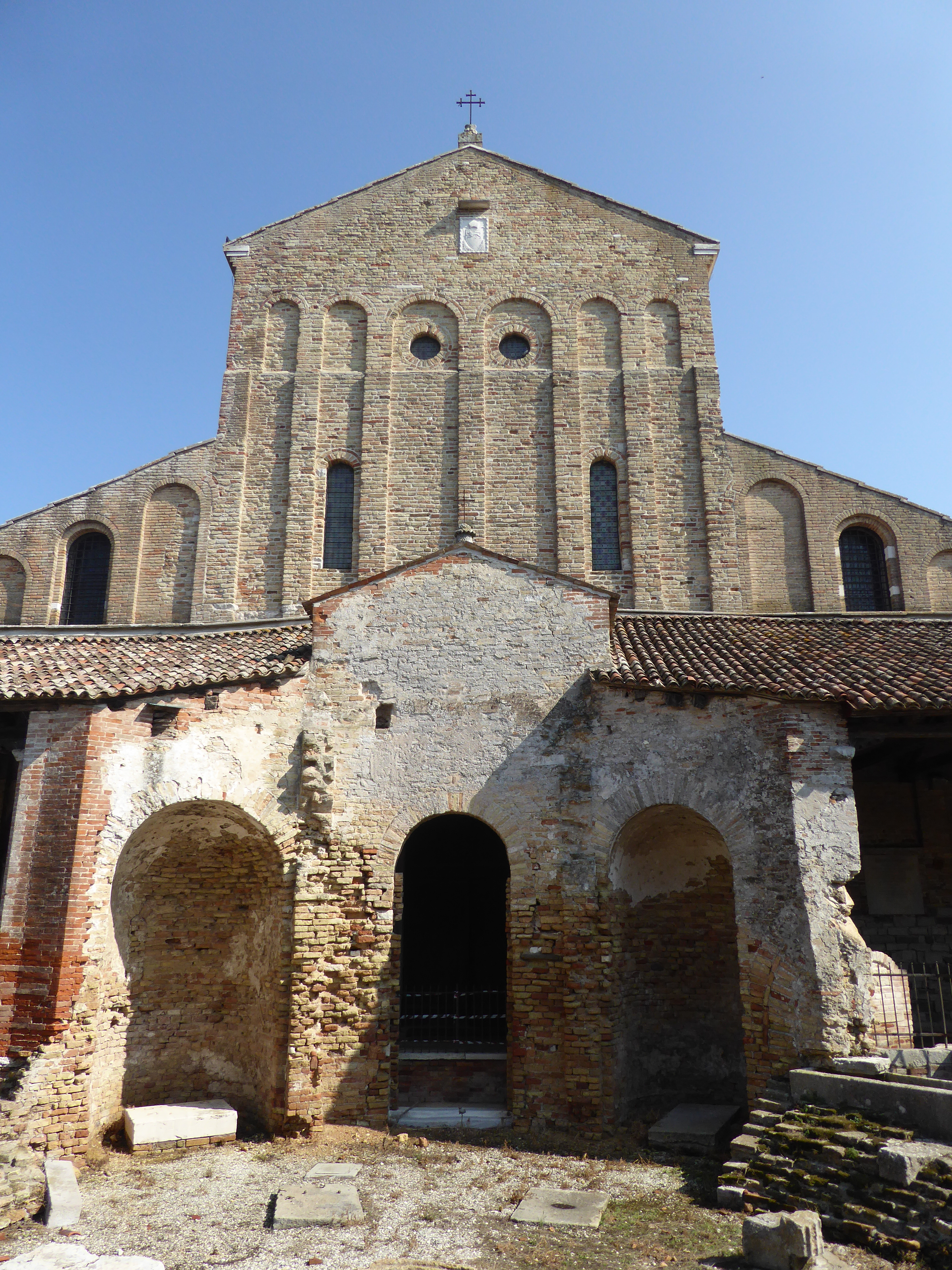
Exterior of the cathedral

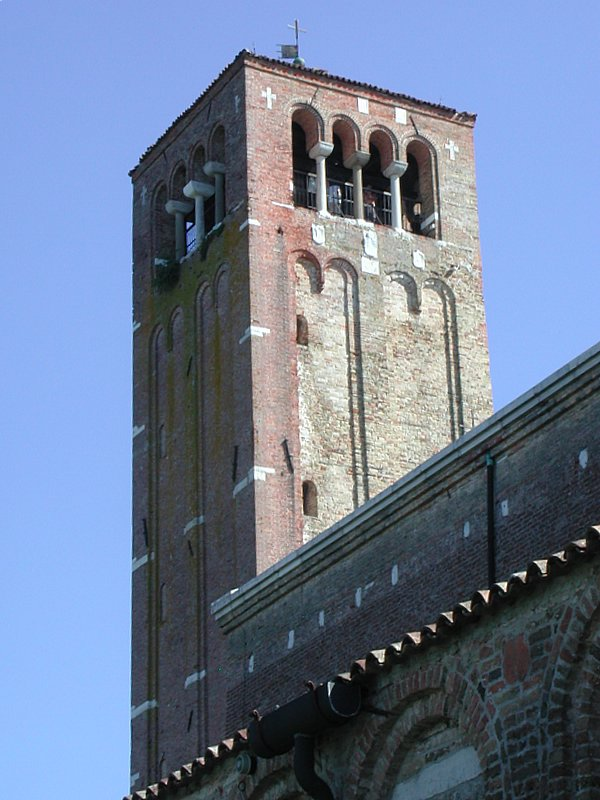
The campanile.

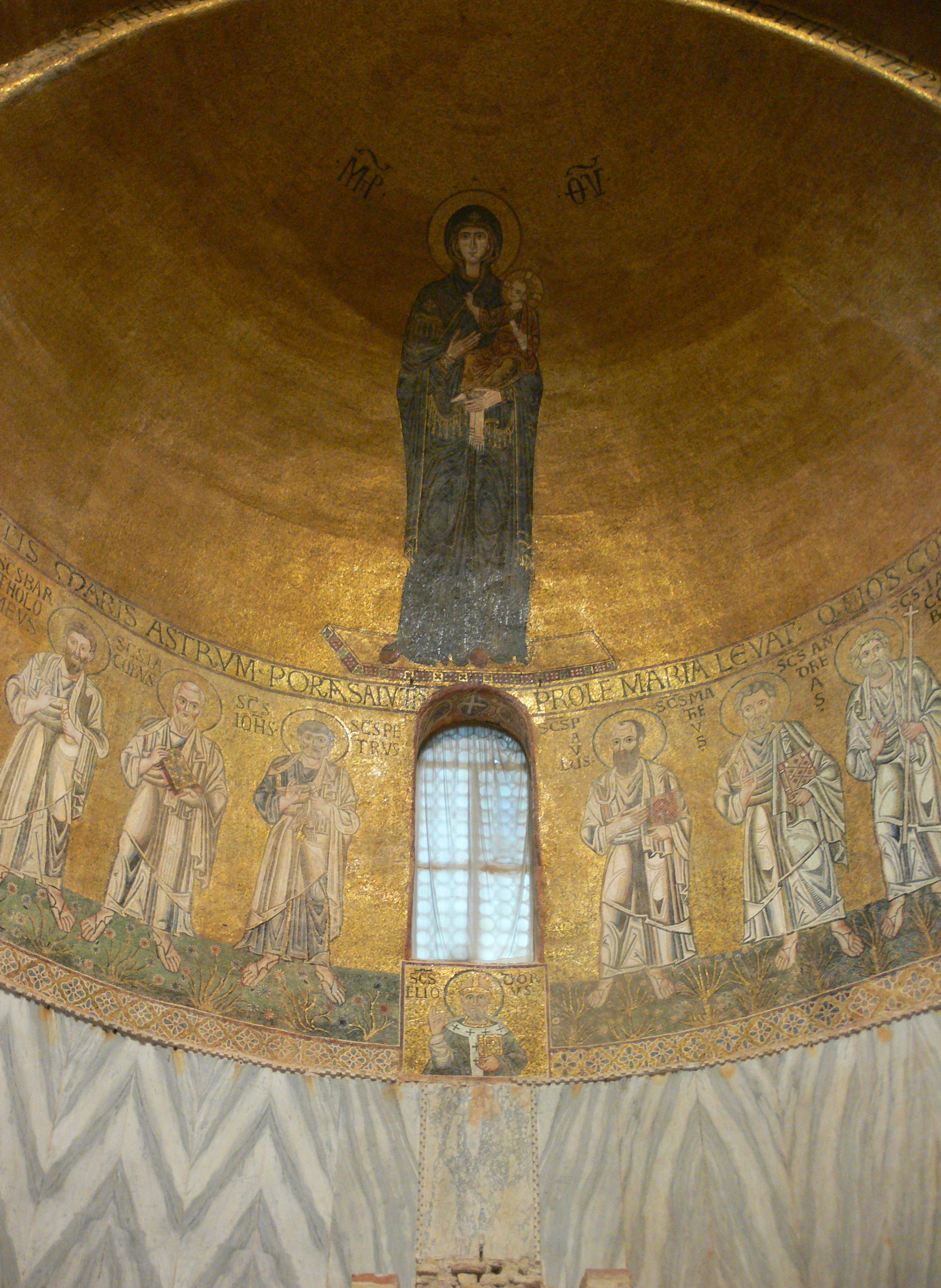
The main apse

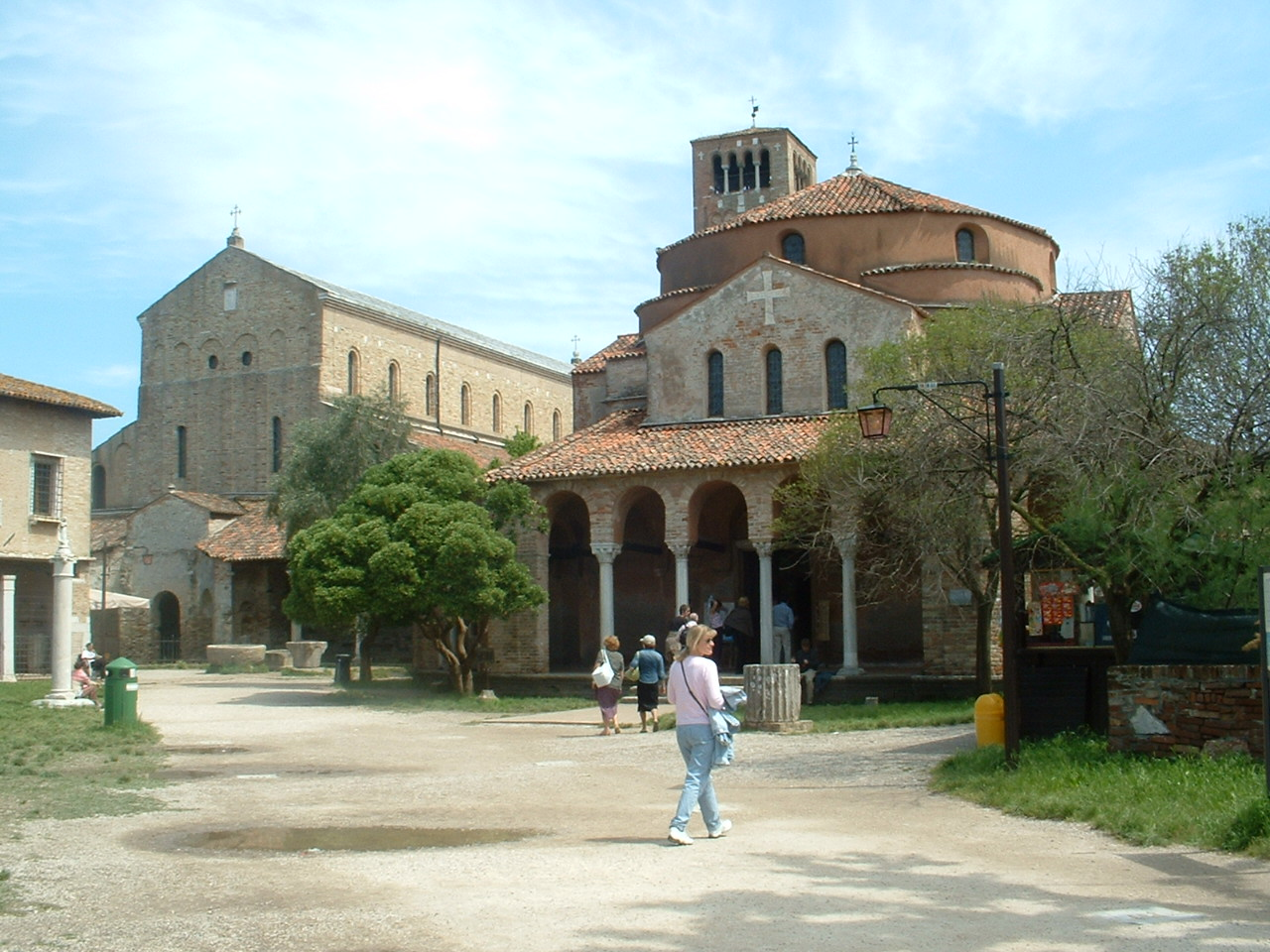
Santa Maria Assunta (left) and Santa Fosca

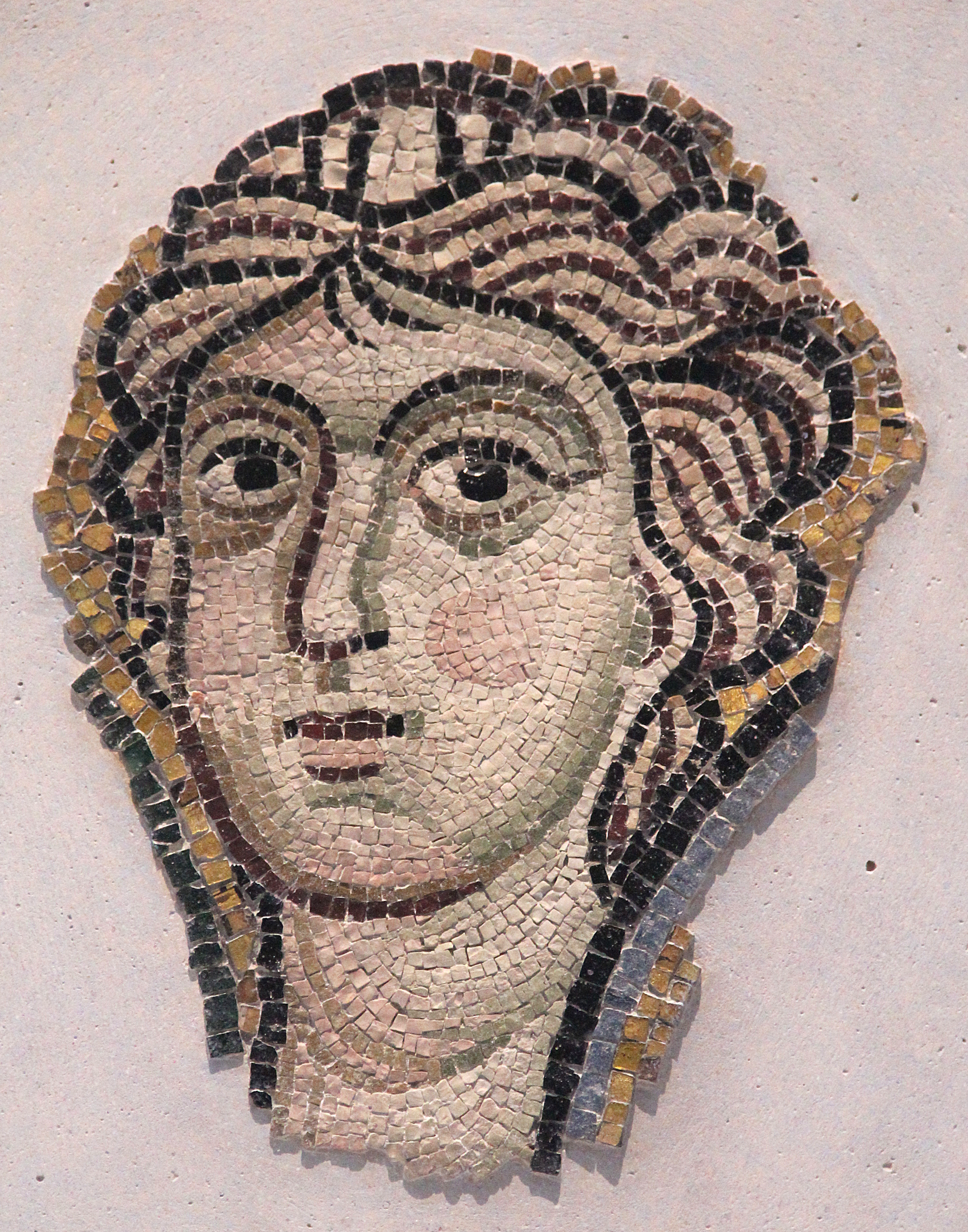
Fragment of a mosaic decorating the interior wall of Santa Maria Assunta.

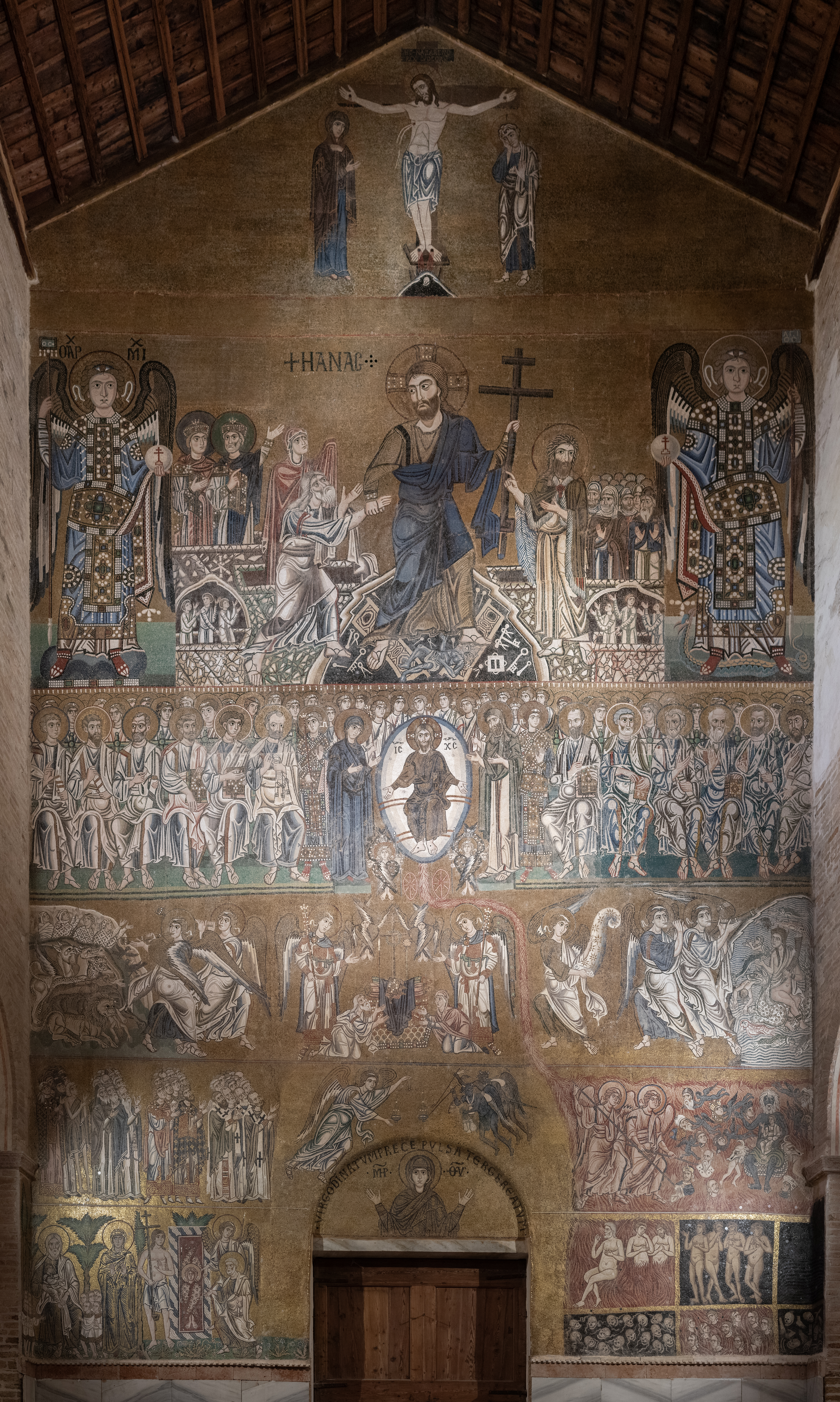
Last Judgement, first half of the 12th century

== See also ==
- High medieval domes
