= Eleutherius and Antia =

Christian saints and martyrs in Albania

Saints Eleutherius and Antia

Martyrs
- Venerated in: Catholic Church; Eastern Orthodoxy; Oriental Orthodoxy
- Canonized: Pre-Congregation
- Major shrine: Cathedral of Rieti, Italy
- Feast: April 18, September 5, November 24, December 15 (Eastern Orthodox Church)
- Attributes: Martyr's palm

Eleutherius, also written as Eleutherus, Eleuterus and Eleftherios (Ancient Greek: Ἐλευθέριος); and his mother Antia, or Anthia (Ancient Greek: Ἀνθία, Italian: Santi Eleuterio e Anzia) are venerated as Christian saints and martyrs in Albania, Greece and Cyprus, and Italy.

== History ==
Born in Rome, Eleutherius's father died when he was a young child and his mother, Anthia, took him to Anicetus, the Bishop of Rome, who taught him in the divine scriptures. Eleutherius is venerated as a bishop of Illyricum; according to tradition, Antia was his mother. According to a source in Greek dating from before the 5th century, Antia was the widow of a consul named Eugenius. Her son Eleutherius was ordained a deacon and priest and then consecrated as bishop by a man named Anicetus. This tradition may have originated through confusion with Pope Eleutherius, who may have been a deacon of Pope Anicetus (c. 154–164).

The tradition states that Eleutherius was appointed bishop of Messana and Illyricum at the age of twenty and apparently settled in Aulon (modern day Vlorë). He was imprisoned by a comes named Felix; Eleutherius and Antia were taken to Rome to be judged by the Emperor Hadrian. According to this source, Eleutherius and Antia were both condemned to death on December 15. According to tradition, Eleutherius was clubbed to death, while Antia was beheaded.

A Latin translation of this Greek text, dating from around the 8th century, states that Anicetus, after consecrating Eleutherius, assigned him to the see of Apuliam Aecanam civitatem (Aeca). Eleutherius and Antia were then taken to Rome and killed on April 18. The source states that the citizens of Aeca retrieved the bodies of the two martyrs from Rome and returned to their city with them.

Baronius uses the descriptive Episcopi Illyrici (bishop of Illyricum) in his Roman Martyrology, since he consulted the Greek source. Hippolyte Delehaye believed the association with Aeca was erroneous, and centuries earlier, Florus had believed Apuliam Aecanam was an error for Apuliam Messenam (Messina), but the association with Messina may also be erroneous. The confusion is increased when it is taken into account the fact that Eleutherius' name, which means "liberator", was translated into Latin as Liberator or possibly Liberalis; he may have been confused with other saints named Liberalis.

Messina still claims Eleutherius and Antia as natives, stating that he was born in this Sicilian city on April 18, 121, and that later Eleutherius became a bishop of Illyricum. They were tortured with hot boiling oil, resin, and heated irons, and then thrown to the lions; none had the desired effect and finally the two were executed.

Their bodies were then, according to tradition, buried in the Roman church of Santa Sabina, in the altar of San Lorenzo, and then moved to San Giovanni della Pigna, near the Pantheon, with the relics of Genesius of Rome. The association with San Giovanni della Pigna may also be a result of confusion with Pope Eleuterus, whose relics were also said to have been translated to San Giovanni della Pigna. Christians from Rieti then may have carried their relics to their city, which still claims them.

== Veneration ==
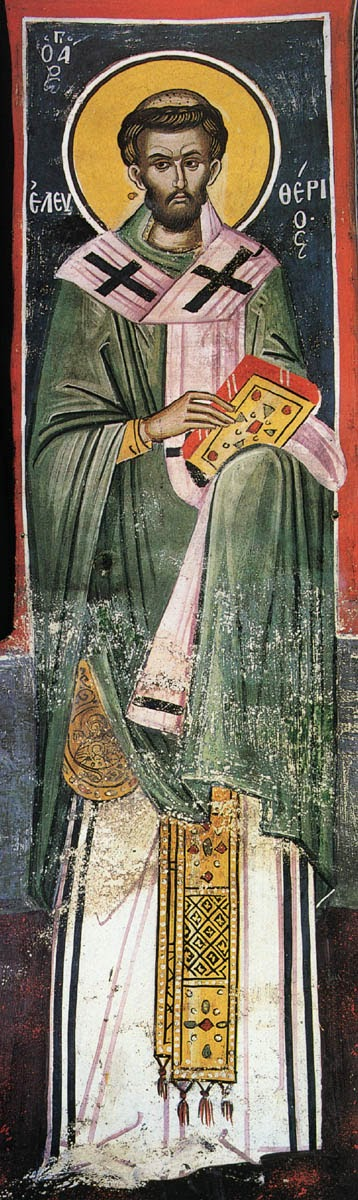
O Ágios Elefthérios o Ieromártyras

Despite this confusion, Eleutherius' cult is ancient and widespread, and his name appears not only in ancient Greek calendars, but also in the Martyrologium Hieronymianum (under April 18, September 5, November 24, where it states “in civitate Riatensi”, a reference to Rieti, where he was also venerated); the Marble Calendar of Naples (under April 18), and in Mozarabic calendars.

=== Rieti ===
The church of Sant'Eleuterio was built outside of the city walls of Rieti around the 5th century. According to tradition, the church claimed the relics of Eleutherius and Antia, carried from Rome by Bishop Primus of Rieti. Around the 5th or 6th centuries, the Benedictine Stephen of Rieti founded a monastic community near the tomb of the two martyrs.

Devotion to Eleutherius increased after a legend associated with the bishop Probus of Rieti: that before his death a vision appeared of the two saints, Eleutherius and Juvenal (Giovenale), to accompany the bishop into heaven.

The church of Sant'Eleuterio acquired importance during the age of the Lombards, with its foundation confirmed with solemn honors by Liutprand. It acquired greater splendor after 1000 AD, when Peter, a local abbot, restored the church and its monastery, which lay near a stream and the city cemetery. In 1122, Count Grimald granted Sant'Eleuterio, the monastery, and its lands to the Cathedral of Santa Maria of Rieti. On August 13, 1198, Bishop Adolphus Secenari and Pope Innocent III translated the relics of the two saints to the cathedral, elevating the church to the status of a collegiate church with twelve canon priests and an abbot-rector.

=== Other places in Italy ===
Numerous churches rose in Italy in honor of this saint. There was a church dedicated to him at Rome, on the Via Labicana. He was venerated on April 18 at Nepi, Vasto, and at Poreč (Parenzo) in Istria. At Chieti, Benevento, Salerno, and Sulmona, he was venerated on May 21; at Terracina on May 13; on May 23 at Arce, and on 31 December at Canne, where he described as a bishop of that town and a son of Evantia (a corruption of Antia). There were other churches dedicated to him at Mugnano del Cardinale and Ariano Irpino.

The monastery of San Liberatore a Maiella was meant to be dedicated to him, but it is actually dedicated to Jesus the Liberator instead.
