= Heliodorus of Altino =

4th-century bishop of Altinum

Saint Heliodorus of Altino
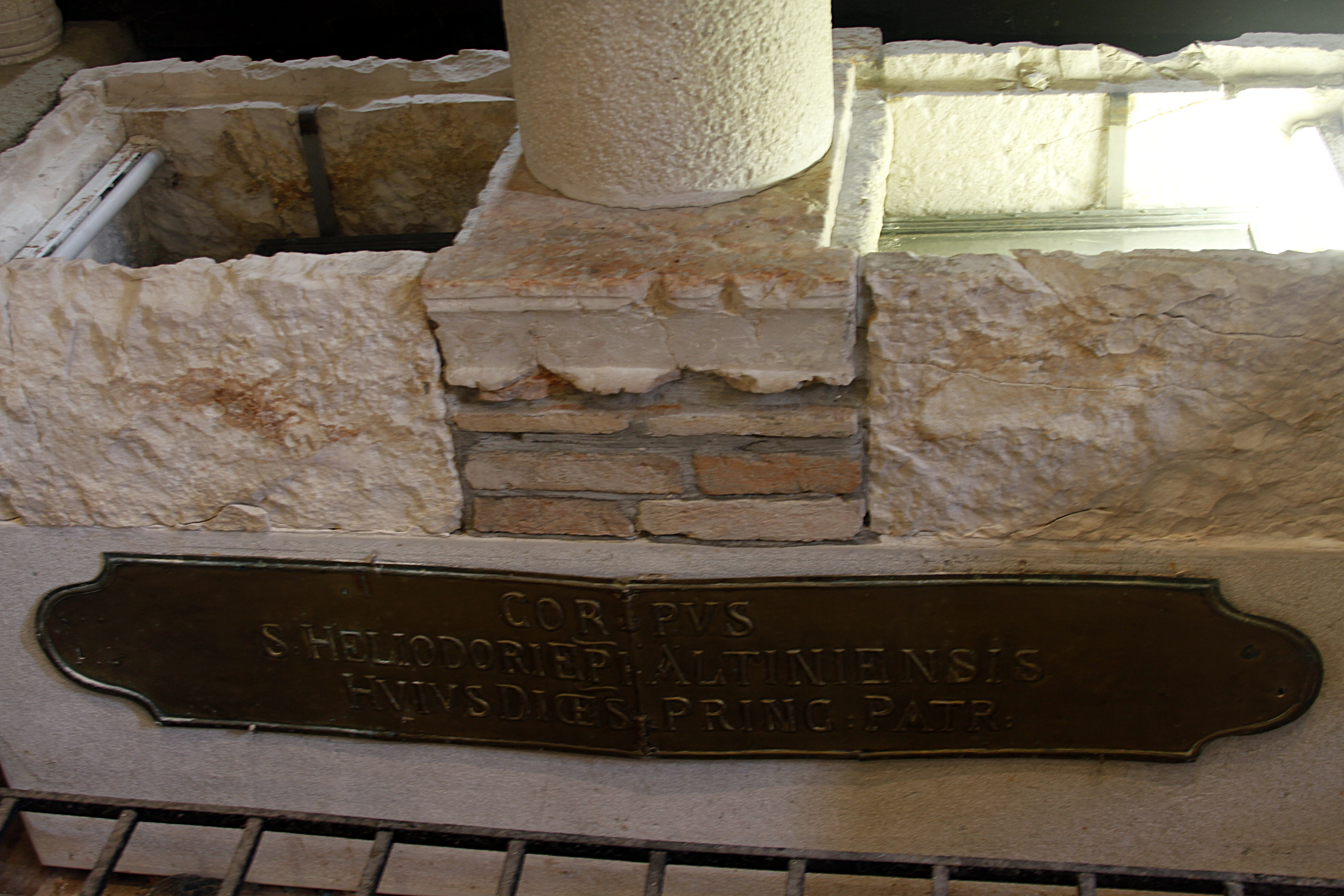
- Relics of Saint Heliodorus in Torcello

Bishop
- Born: 4th century
- Died: ~390
- Venerated in: Eastern Orthodox Church; Roman Catholic Church
- Major shrine: Cathedral of Santa Maria Assunta, Torcello
- Feast: 3 July
- Patronage: Torcello

Heliodorus (Italian: Sant'Eliodoro; died c. 410 AD) was the first bishop of Altinum in the 4th century. He was born in Dalmatia. Like Chromatius, he was a disciple of Valerianus, the bishop of Aquileia.

He accompanied Jerome on his voyage to the Holy Land, and is mentioned in Jerome's letters. After the death of his mother, Heliodorus went to Italy and was made bishop of Altino. He attempted to counter Arianism in his see, and attended the anti-Arian Council of Aquileia (381). Heliodorus ordained Nepotianus, his nephew, after he left his position as an officer in the imperial bodyguard.

A legend, composed around the 10th century and incorporating elements from other saints' hagiographies, states that Liberalis of Treviso was educated in the Christian faith by Heliodorus. The legend goes on to state that, faced with growing opposition from both Arianism and paganism in the see, Heliodorus retired as bishop and lived as a hermit on a desert island in the lagoons near Altino, entrusting the see to a man named Ambrose. Worried about Ambrose's ability to handle the rise of Arianism in the see, Liberalis decided to find Heliodorus and convince him to come back to his see, but died on the way, and was later venerated as a saint.

== Veneration ==
Heliodorus' relics were carried to Altino during the barbarian invasions and then to Torcello, where they rest in a sepulcher in the Cathedral of Santa Maria Assunta.
