= Man with Red Hat =

Painting by Vittore Carpaccio

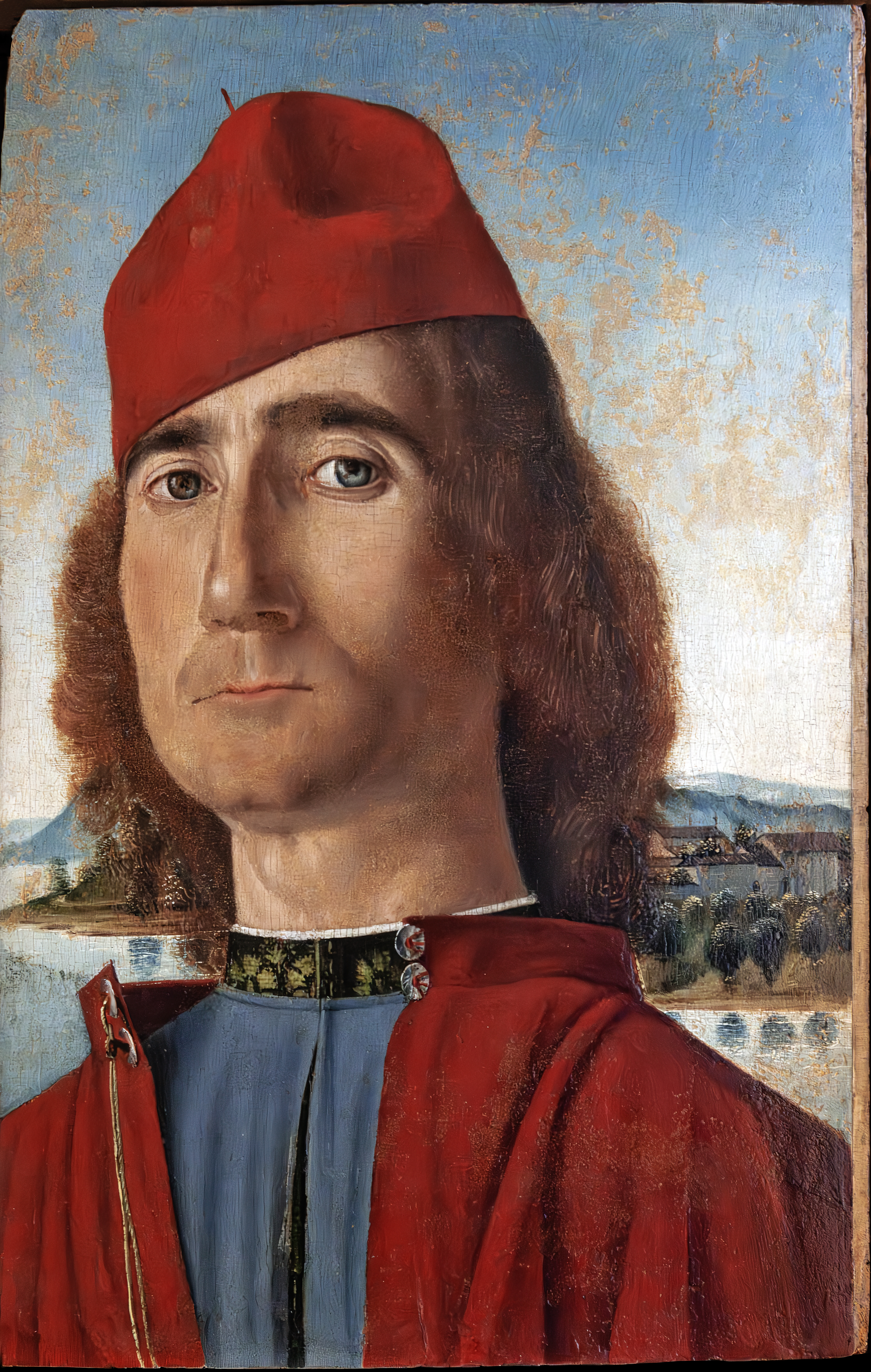
- Artist: Vittore Carpaccio
- Year: c. 1490–1493
- Medium: Tempera on panel
- Dimensions: 35 cm × 23 cm (14 in × 9.1 in)
- Location: Museo Correr, Venice

Man with a Red Hat is a tempera on panel painting attributed to Italian Renaissance painter Vittore Carpaccio, created around 1490–1493. It is housed in the Museo Correr in Venice.

== Description ==
The attribution to Carpaccio is disputed. Bartolomeo Montagna and Lorenzo Lotto have been also proposed as artists responsible for the piece, while others have assigned it to an unknown master from Ferrara or Bologna. The dating is less controversial, having been assigned to the early 1490s, when Carpaccio was painting the Legend of Saint Ursula and other cycles in Venice, and personal portraits of noblemen were becoming common.

The painting depicts an unknown man's face and (partially) bust, above a landscape background. The latter includes a lake, a portion of countryside and mountains, partially hidden by a far haze.

== Sources ==
- Valcanover, Francesco (2007). "Vittore Carpaccio". Pittori del Rinascimento. Florence: Scala. ISBN 978-8881170999.
