= Dead Christ Supported by Two Angels (Bellini, Venice) =

Painting by Giovanni Bellini

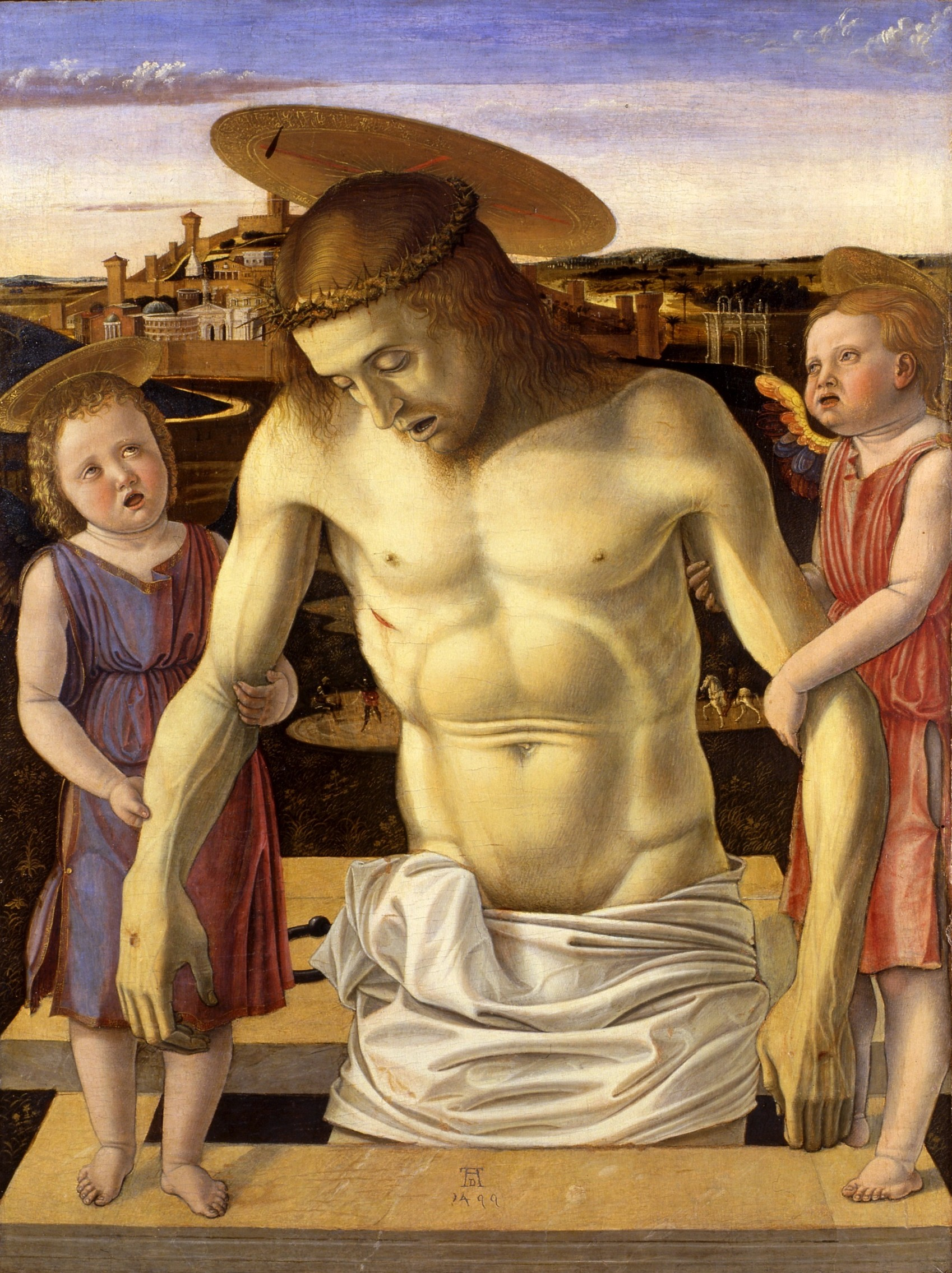
- Artist: Giovanni Bellini
- Year: c. 1460
- Medium: Tempera on poplar panel
- Dimensions: 74 cm × 50 cm (29 in × 20 in)
- Location: Museo Correr

Dead Christ Supported by Two Angels is a tempera painting on panel by the Italian Renaissance painter Giovanni Bellini, created around 1460. It is now in the Museo Correr in Venice.

The panel is one of Bellini's earliest Pietà compositions, together with those in the Accademia Carrara of Bergamo and in the Museo Poldi Pezzoli of Milan. The date in the sepulchre's edge (1499) is apocryphal, as is Albrecht Dürer's monogram.

== See also ==
- List of works by Giovanni Bellini
