= Crucifixion (Bellini) =

Painting by Giovanni Bellini, Museo Correr

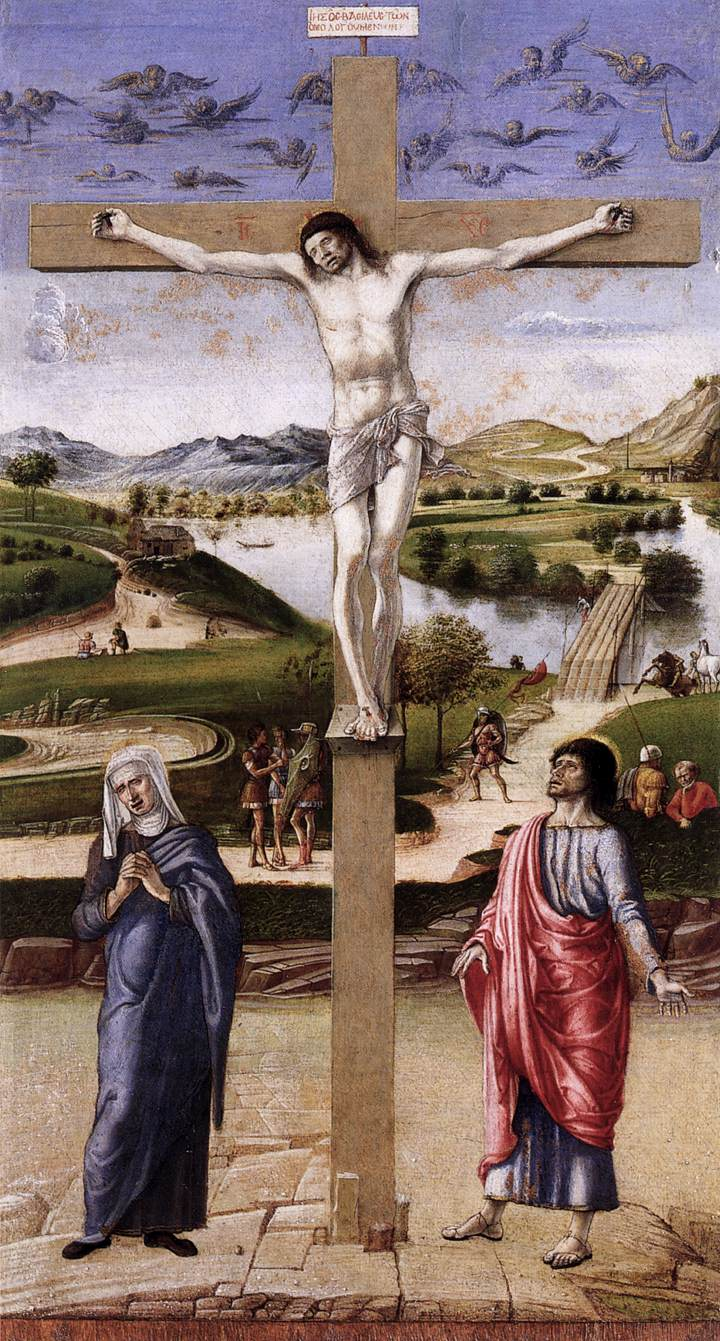
- Artist: Giovanni Bellini
- Year: c. 1455–1460
- Medium: Tempera on panel
- Dimensions: 55 cm × 30 cm (22 in × 12 in)
- Location: Museo Correr

Crucifixion is a painting by the Italian Renaissance painter Giovanni Bellini, created around 1455–1460. It is housed in the Museo Correr in Venice.

The work was originally in the church of San Salvador of Venice, and is part of the Mantegna-influenced phase of Bellini's early career.

== Description ==
The painting shows the crucified Jesus, portrayed with a very pale skin, on a broad landscape background. The deep blue sky is populated by cherubim who are weeping at his death. In the lower part are Mary and St. John.

The background shows several details, including a lake with a wooden bridge, a quarry, small houses and a series of small working figures. Such a fragmented, detailed composition was typical of Jacopo Bellini, the artist's father, and was replaced by a more coherent one in Bellini's later works. Other elements typical of his early works are the rather crude painting strokes, the thin figures and the sharp lines.

== See also ==
- Transfiguration of Christ (Bellini)
- List of works by Giovanni Bellini

== Sources ==
- Olivari, Mariolina (2007). "Giovanni Bellini". Pittori del Rinascimento, Scala. Florence. ISBN 978-8881170999.
