= Two Venetian Ladies =

Painting by Vittore Carpaccio

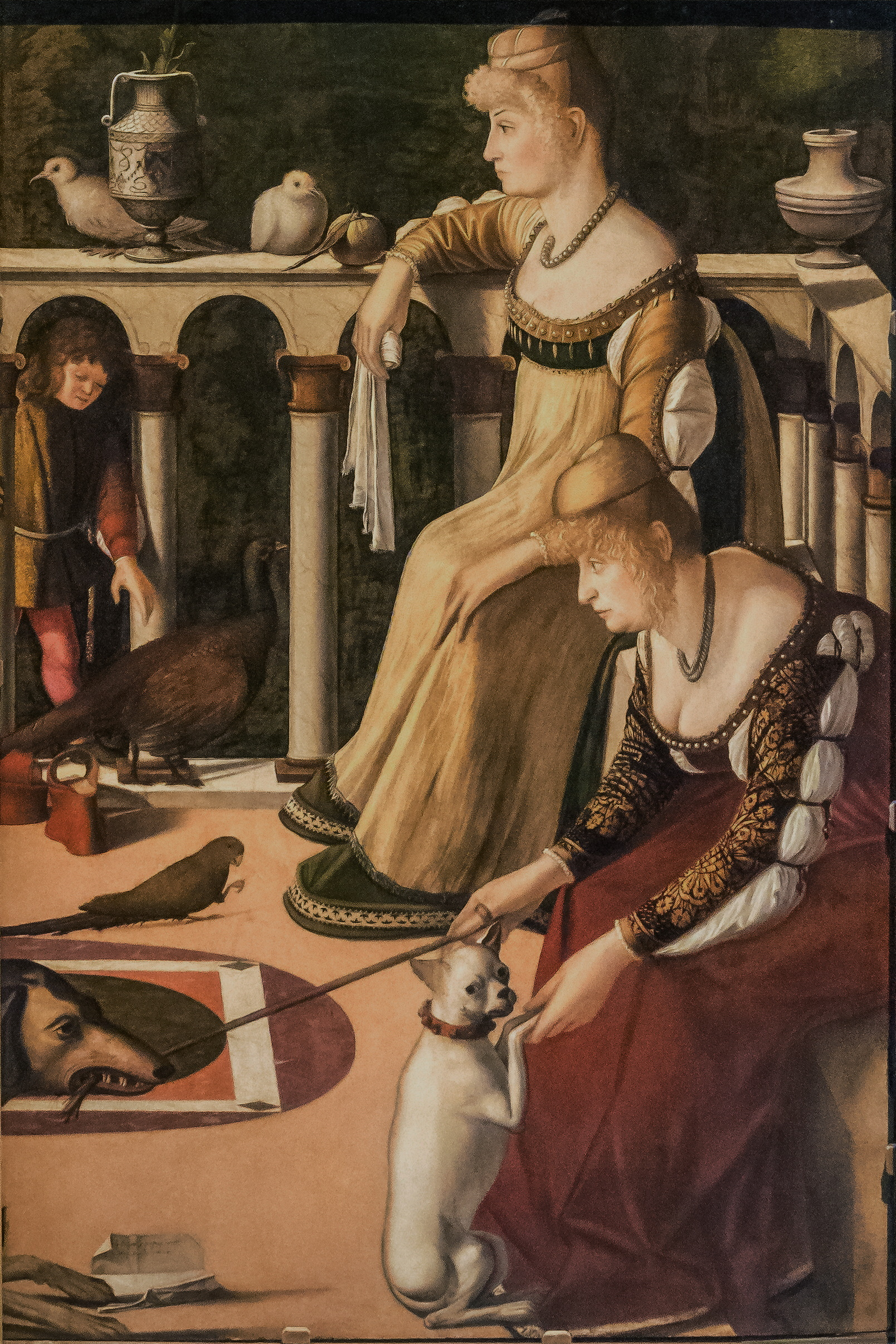
- Artist: Vittore Carpaccio
- Year: c. 1490
- Medium: Oil on panel
- Dimensions: 94 cm × 64 cm (37 in × 25 in)
- Location: Museo Correr, Venice

Two Venetian Ladies is an oil on panel painting by the Italian Renaissance artist Vittore Carpaccio. The painting, believed to be a quarter of the original work, was executed around 1490 and shows two unknown Venetian ladies. The top portion of the panel, called Hunting on the Lagoon is in the Getty Museum, and another matching panel is missing.

Beginning in the nineteenth century, the painting began to be interpreted as depicting two courtesans, some commentators pointing to the red chopines, or platform clogs, on the left, as supposed markers of such women, while their apparent idleness, or their low décolletage, led others to that conclusion. Modern art historians think them more likely to be members of the patrician Torella family: the Torella crest appears on the vase shown on the parapet, and their fine clothes and pearl necklaces, suggest high status. The style of their gowns and personal presentation conforms to that of high-born Venetian women of the time. Several objects – the white kerchief, the pearls and the animals (the doves, Venus's bird) – are symbols of chastity. Academic debate continues, as with other similar Venetian paintings of the period.

Another painted panel, now in the Getty Museum, was published in 1944, and it was later realized that this is part of the same work, fitting above this part: it portrays several boats in a lagoon, and would explain the meaning of the scene, as two women awaiting their husbands' return after an expedition hunting, or fishing with cormorants, in the Venetian lagoon. Another panel the same size as these two combined would have been on the left; probably the two were hinged together to make a diptych, or a folding door or shutter. The Getty panel has an illusionistic letter rack painted on the back of the panel, which was presumably matched on this panel. This appears to be the earliest small-scale trompe-l'œil painting since antiquity. This discovery was verified by an in-depth technical analysis, comparing the two fragmentary panels.

Hunting on the Lagoon, J. Paul Getty Museum (79.PB.72)

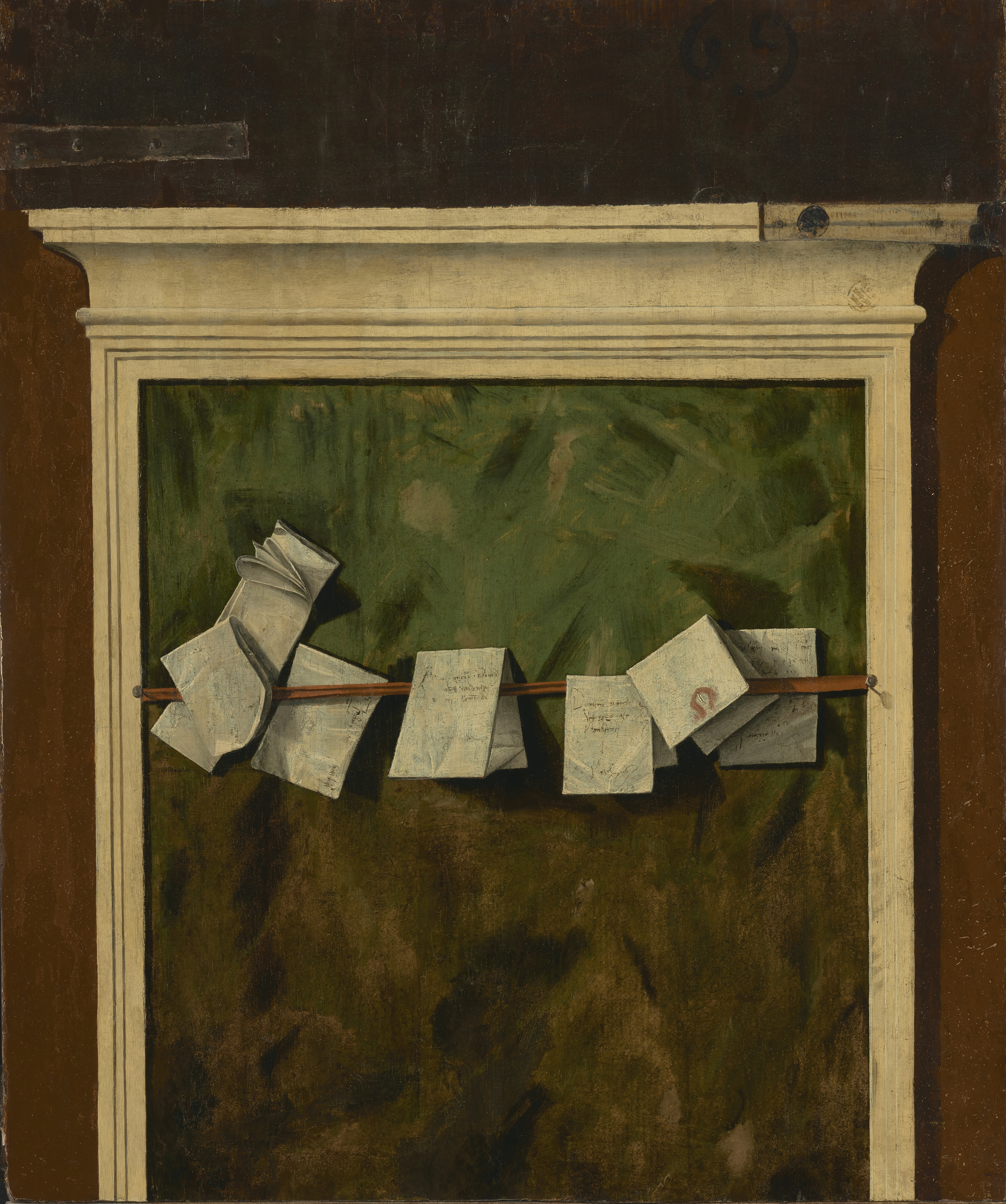
Letter Rack, verso of hunting scene (Getty Museum, 79.PB.72)

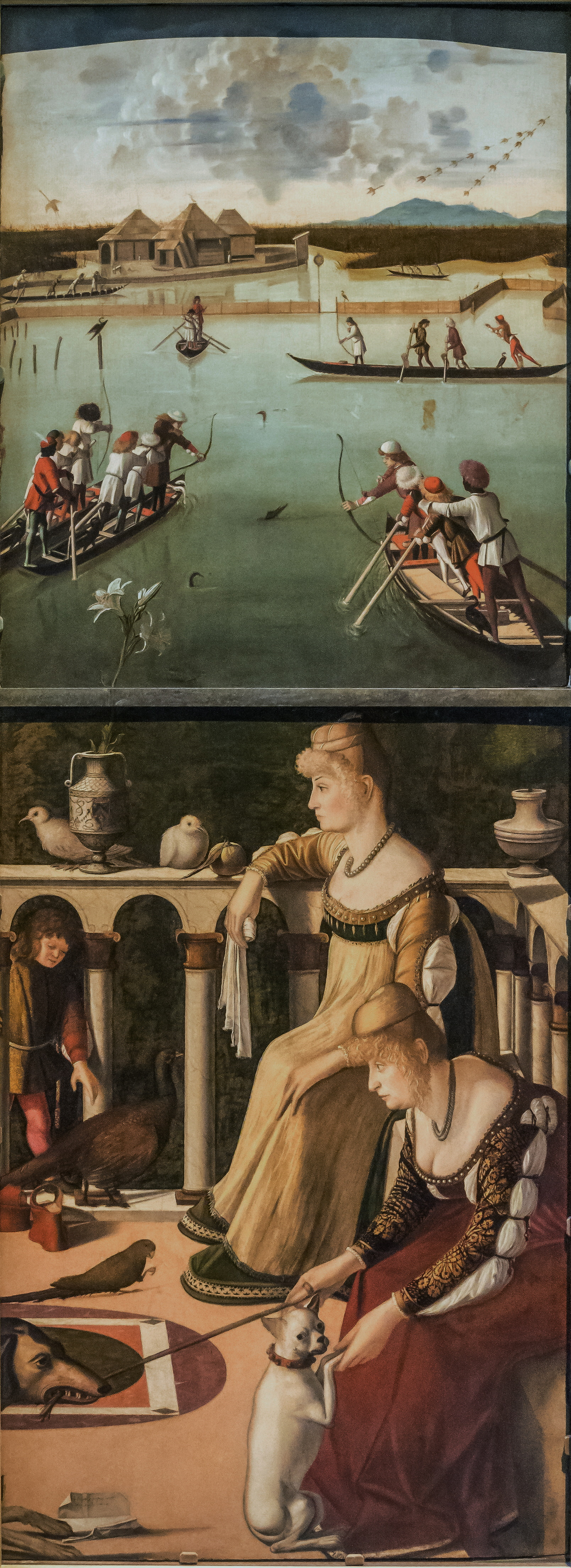
Photographic reconstruction of the whole panel
