= Museo Correr =

Art museum, historic site in Venice, Italy

Coordinates: 45.4339°N 12.3375°E

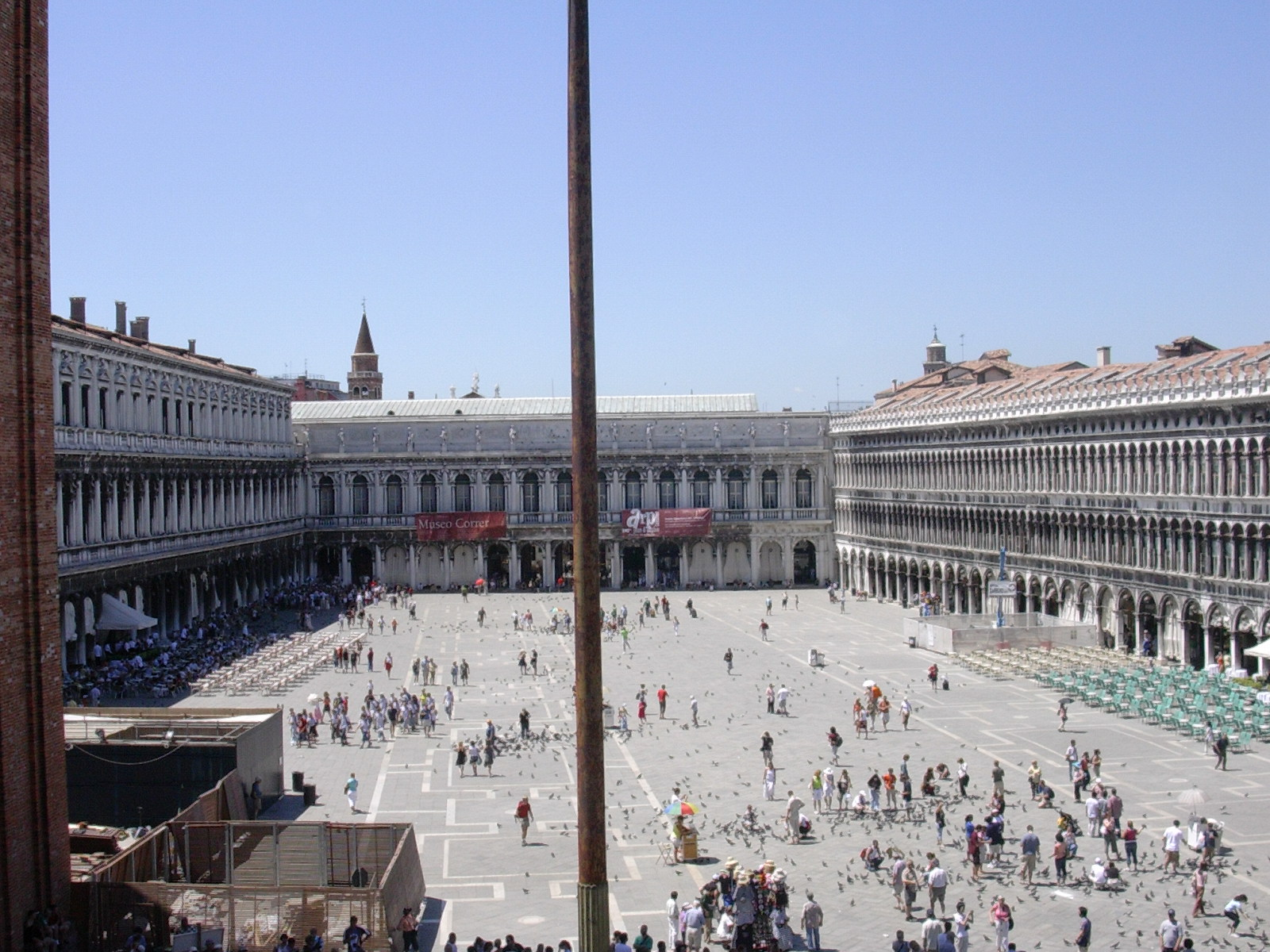
- The Museo Correr is housed in the west and south flanks of the Piazza San Marco
- Established: 1830
- Location: Piazza San Marco 52, 30124 Venice, Italy
- Type: Art museum, historic site
- Director: Andrea Bellieni
- Website: correr.visitmuve.it

The Museo Correr (Italian pronunciation: [muˈzɛo korˈrɛr]) is a museum in Venice, northern Italy. Located in St. Mark's Square, Venice, it is one of the 11 civic museums run by the Fondazione Musei Civici di Venezia. The museum extends along the southside of the square on the upper floors of the Procuratorie Nuove. With its rich and varied collections, the Museo Correr covers both the art and history of Venice.

== History ==
The Museo Correr originated with the collection bequeathed to the city of Venice in 1830 by Teodoro Correr. A member of a traditional Venetian family, Correr was a meticulous and passionate collector, dedicating most of his life to the collection of both works of art and documents or individual objects that reflected the history of Venice. Upon his death, all this material was donated to the city, together with the family's Grand Canal palace which then housed it. The nobleman also left the city funds to be used in conserving and extending the collections and in making them available to the public.

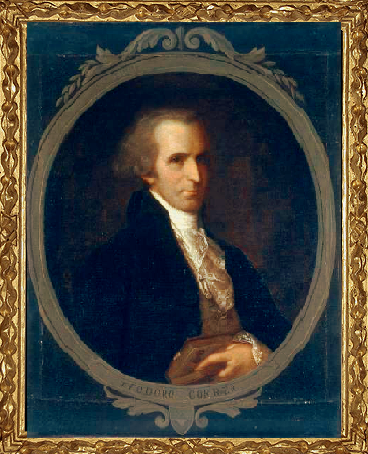
Teodoro Correr. Portrait by Bernardino Castelli

The period when he was gathering his collections was a very particular one: the Republic of Venice had fallen in 1797 and for decades thereafter the city would be under French and Austrian rulers. Out of real necessity, many Venetian families were eager to sell off their valuable collections. Several collections ended up being bought by foreigners, but in the early decades of the 19th century there were still many pieces on the market. An insatiable collector, Correr, from his youth bought all sorts of objects and dedicated all his resources in putting together an incredible amount of material. Correr would reveal himself to have a sharp eye, putting together a collection that was undoubtedly very original. He was explicit about his intention that the collections should be made available to the public, and the museum was finally open in 1836.

Over the years, the contents of the museum would be catalogued and organized to provide scholars with a study facility and the general public with the opportunity to see the best from each individual collection. Subsequent bequests, donations and acquisitions would be added to the collection, ultimately leading to various pieces being housed on other venues.

=== From the Correr Collection to the Musei Civici Veneziani ===
Among the new pieces were the collections donated by several important Venetian families, such as the Molin, the Zoppetti, the Tironi, the Sagredo, and the Cicogna, and these included significant paintings, maiolica, glass pieces, and bronzes. In 1887, the enlarged collection was moved from Palazzo Correr to the nearby Fondaco dei Turchi, where it was laid out in a new display. However, in 1922, the Museo Correr was moved again to its present location in Piazza San Marco.

In the 1990s, the entire civic museums system was redesigned, all under a single municipal administration. In 1996, thanks to an agreement with the Italian Ministry of Culture, the St. Mark's Square Museums ticket was launched, granting entrance not only to the Museo Correr, but also the Doge's Palace, the Museo Archeologico Nazionale and the Monumental Rooms of the Biblioteca Marciana. Finally, in March 2008, the Museo Correr became part of the Fondazione Musei Civici di Venezia system.

== The museum ==
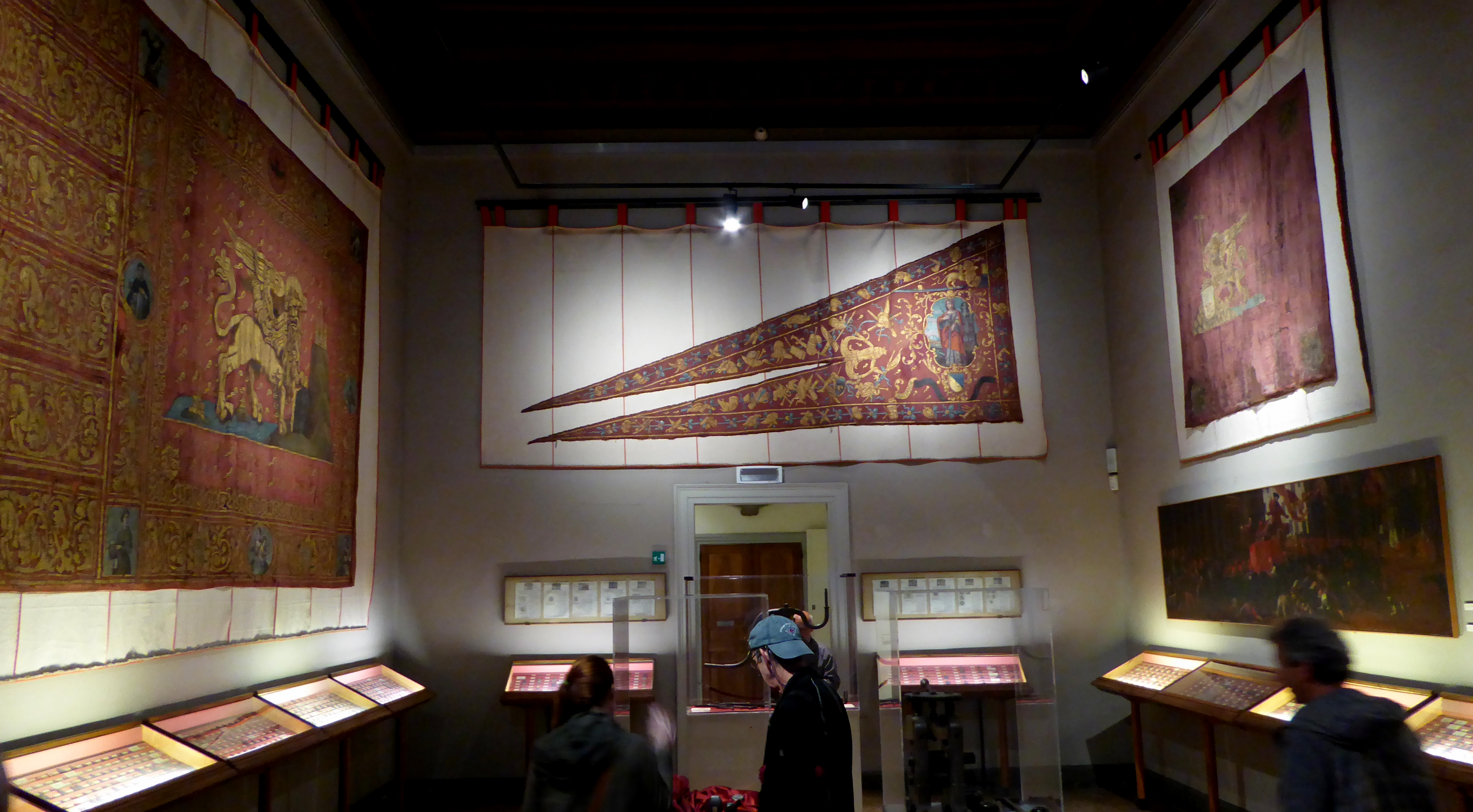
Hall of flags in the Museo Correr

The building that encloses the far end of the Piazza San Marco is known as the Napoleonic Wing. The design and early building works date from the period when Venice was part of the Kingdom of Italy (1806–1814), in which Napoleon was represented by the vice-regent Eugène de Beauharnais. The two long wings that run the length of the square are the Procuratie Vecchie and the Procuratie Nuove, which had housed the offices and residences of some of the main individuals of the Venetian Republic.

When the city came under Napoleonic rule, the French emperor and his court realized that public representation of imperial power posed certain logistical and political problems. Having rejected the Doge's Palace because of its complex past, these turned to the Procuratie Nuove, the former residence of the Procurators of Saint Mark, along the southern edge of the square. Designed in 1582 by Vincenzo Scamozzi, this structure itself had at the time been intended to complete the vast project for the reorganization of the Piazza San Marco, which had begun with Sansovino in the mid-16th century. From 1586 to 1596, works were complete on the ten arcades that extended beyond Sansovino's Library, and then, around 1640, the rest of the Procuratie Nuove was completed by Baldassarre Longhena. And this was the building which, by January 1807, Napoleon decreed should become the Imperial Palace.

All the interiors within the Procuratie Nuove were changed, with the re-decoration reflecting the taste for Neoclassicism, together with the Napoleonic Wing – which now stands opposite St. Mark's Basilica – which was designed by Giuseppe Soli and Lorenzo Santi and incorporated into the palace.

When Venice came under Austrian dominion in 1814, the palace served as a residence of the House of Habsburg, and Emperor Francis I would stay there in 1815.

In 1866, after Venice became part of unified Italy, the palace passed to the House of Savoy. In 1919, Victor Emmanuel III, king of Italy, handed it over to the State for use by the Ministry of Education. Hence, in 1920, part of the building was used to house the Museo Archeologico Nazionale, and then in 1922 another area became home to the Museo Correr.

=== Neoclassical Palace and Canova Collection ===
An antechamber leads into the Napoleonic Gallery which runs across the end of the Piazza San Marco. Comprising a Ballroom, Throne Room and Banqueting Hall, this is the core of the public area of the palace, exhibiting artworks by Antonio Canova.

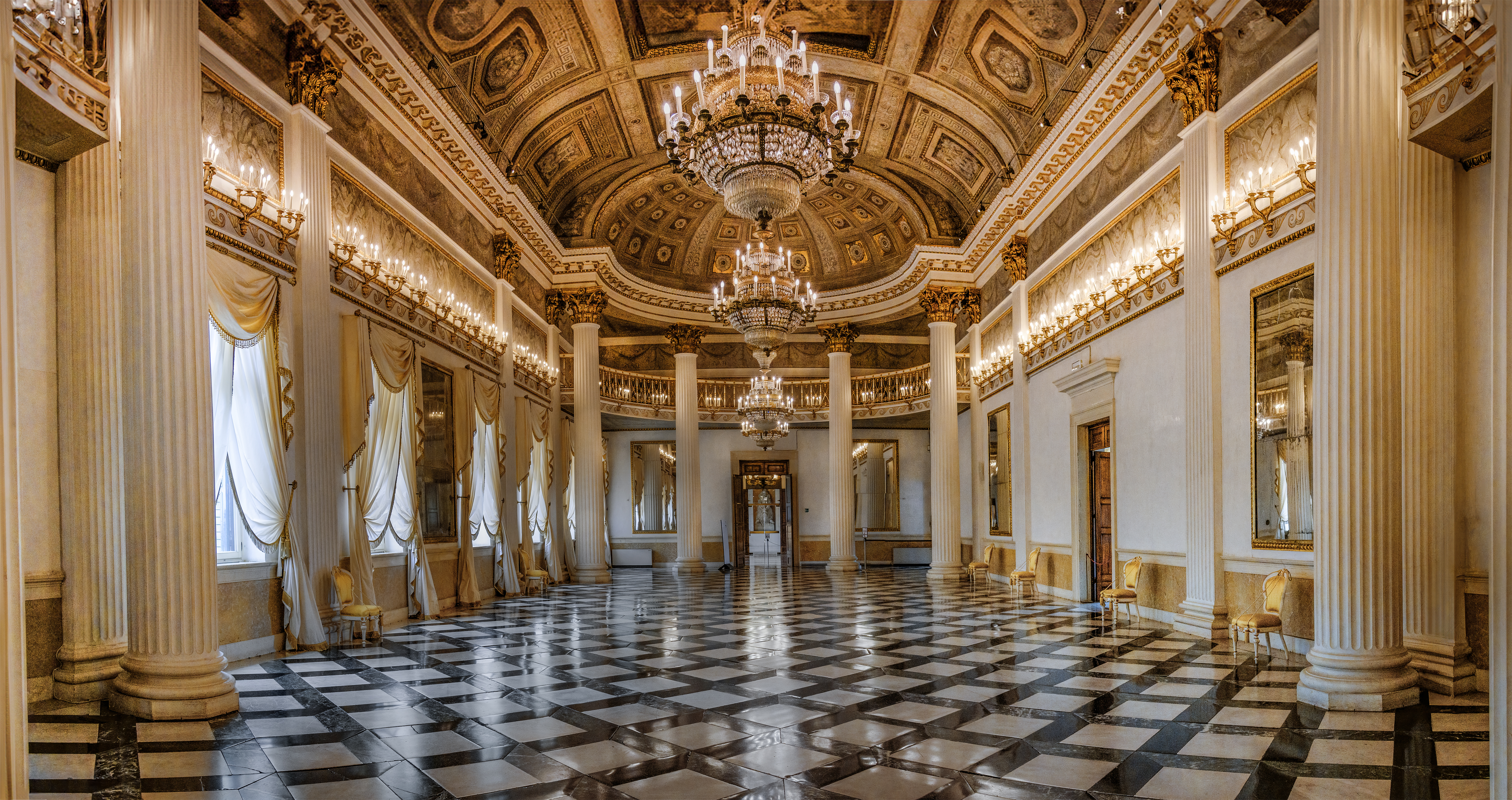
Ballroom

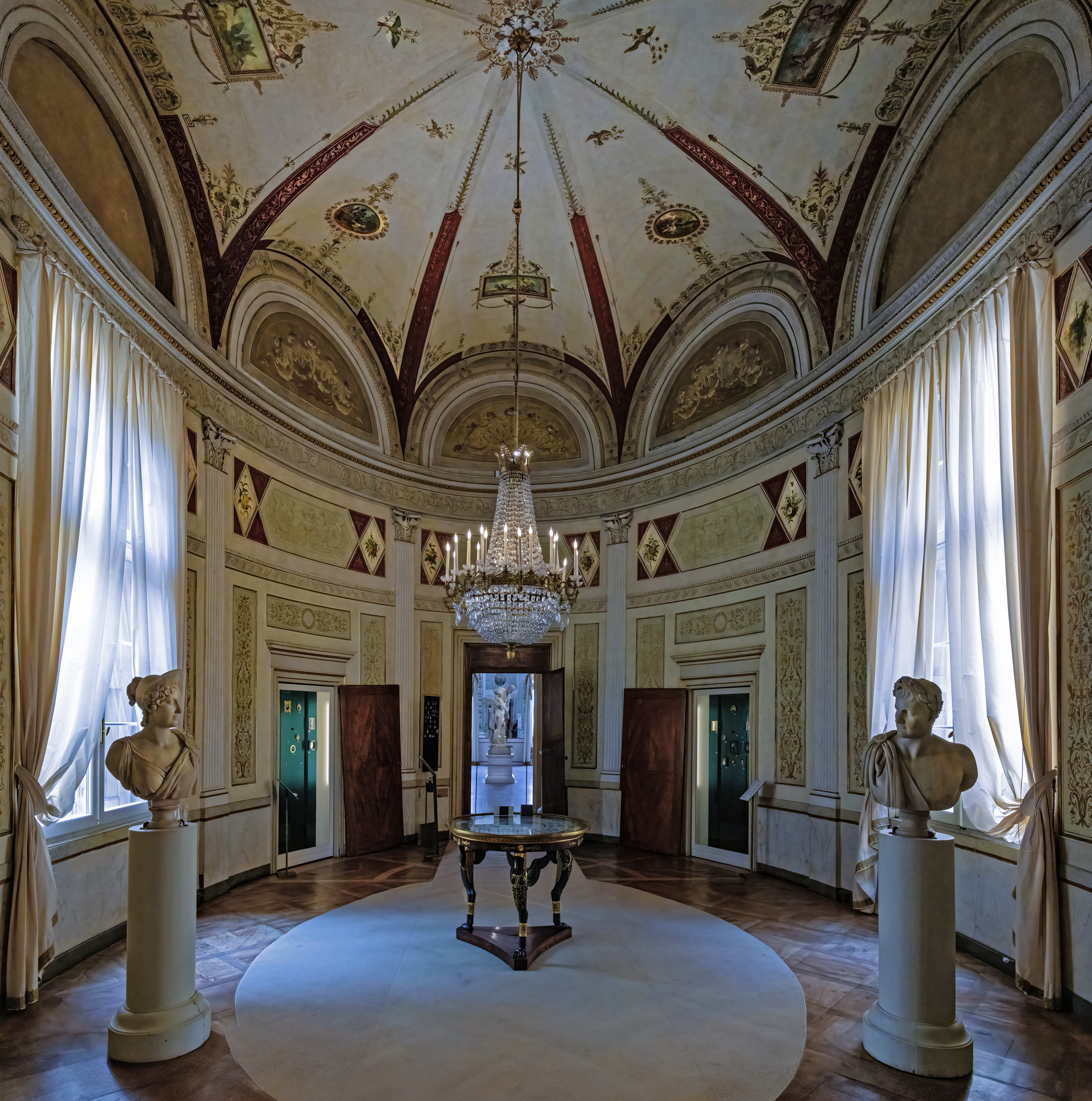
Oval Room (Dining room)

=== Venetian life and culture ===
Saint Justina and the Treasurers (1580) by Tintoretto

The first floor of the Museo Correr illustrates the life and culture of the Venetian Republic over the centuries of its political grandeur and independence.

- Rooms 6 and 7 illustrate the period when the Doge's power was at its highest and then charts the decline of the figure during the last years of the Republic, including works by Giovanni da Asola, Andrea Michieli, Girolamo Pilotti, Gian Antonio Guardi, Lazzaro Bastiani, Joseph Heintz the Younger, Michele Giambono, Matteo Pagan, Cesare Vecellio, and Giambattista Brustolon.
- Room 8 houses the architectural library in solid walnut which once stood in Palazzo Pisani a San Stefano in San Vidal (where the Venice Conservatory is now) and contains rare manuscripts, printed works produced in the period from the early 16th to the 18th century, and the museum's large collection of commissioni ducali.
- Rooms 9 and 10 exhibit portraits of Venetian aristocrats and officials who served the Republic, including senators and Procurators of Saint Mark. Nautical maps and charts in ink and watercolor are also on display, dating from the 15th to the 16th century, and showing continental Europe and the Mediterranean as far as the area of the Caspian Sea. Finally, the rooms also exhibit collections of topographical instruments dating from the 17th and 18th century.
- Room 11 displays the Museo Correr's numismatic collection, an almost complete series of coins minted by the Venetian Republic from its origins (early 9th century AD) to its fall (1797), organized chronologically. Some 18th-century machinery from the Mint and medals are also exhibited, together with a painting by Tintoretto, Saint Justina and the Treasurers.
- Room 12 explores Venice's natural affinity with the sea and its hegemony over the Adriatic and the eastern Mediterranean. There are also original navigational instruments and other implements used on-board and paintings celebrating the great naval battles fought by the Venetians.
- Room 13 illustrates what once was the Venetian Arsenal, an industrial-scale complex of shipyards and docks which was the mainstay of Venice's maritime power. Displays include artworks by Antonio Di Natale, Michele Marieschi, Giacomo Franco, and Alessandro Longhi, as well as 18th-century wooden models and navigational instruments which were used in the Arsenal in the designing and building of ships.
- Room 14, Venice Forma Urbis, exhibits cartographical renderings of Venice, such as the famous bird's-eye view by Jacopo de' Barbari, and paintings, all exploring the city's birth and expansion.
- Rooms 15 and 16 display pieces related to the city's military power. The armors date from the 16th and 17th century, while the swords, knives, war clubs and maces date from the 14th to the 16th century. There is also an example of an Ottoman tent, some parade falchions from the late-16th century, barrel cannons, barrel firearms, and pistols.
- Rooms 17 and 18 exhibit works associated with the Venetian general and doge Francesco Morosini, who led the city's forces several times against the Ottomans in the 17th century.

=== Art collections ===
Beginning in Room 19, the art collection in Museo Correr is divided into two parts. On the first floor, four rooms house the collection of small bronzes, including pieces by Veneto region sculptors from the late 15th to the first decades of the 17th century. On the second floor, 19 rooms display the Picture Gallery, which focuses primarily on Venetian painting up to the 16th century. There are also rooms dedicated to maiolica-work and to carved ivories.

The Picture Gallery starts at the end of Room 14 and comprises examples of Venetian paintings from the very earliest days right up to the beginning of the 16th century.

Repeatedly re-organized during the history of the museum, the gallery still substantially reflects the original collection left by Teodoro Correr, comprising artworks by Giovanni Bellini (including the early Crucifixion, Transfiguration of Christ, a Madonna and Child and Dead Christ Supported by Two Angels), Antonello da Messina, Cosmè Tura, Vittore Carpaccio (Man with Red Hat and Two Venetian Ladies), and others. Further bequests, gifts, loans, and acquisitions have added to this heritage. Other artists who are present throughout the exhibition rooms include Paolo Veneziano, Lorenzo Veneziano, Stefano Veneziano, Jacobello di Bonomo, Michele Giambono, Jacobello del Fiore, Gentile da Fabriano, Pisanello, Matteo Giovannetti, Bartolomeo Vivarini, Leonardo Boldrini, Pieter Bruegel the Younger, Jacopo Bellini, Alvise Vivarini, Cima da Conegliano, Lorenzo Lotto, Boccaccio Boccaccino, and several other important Italian and European artists.
