= Leonardo Boldrini =

Italian painter

Leonardo Boldrini (16th century) was an Italian painter of the Renaissance. He painted an altarpiece, whose panels are now hanging apart in the church of San Gallo near Zogno.

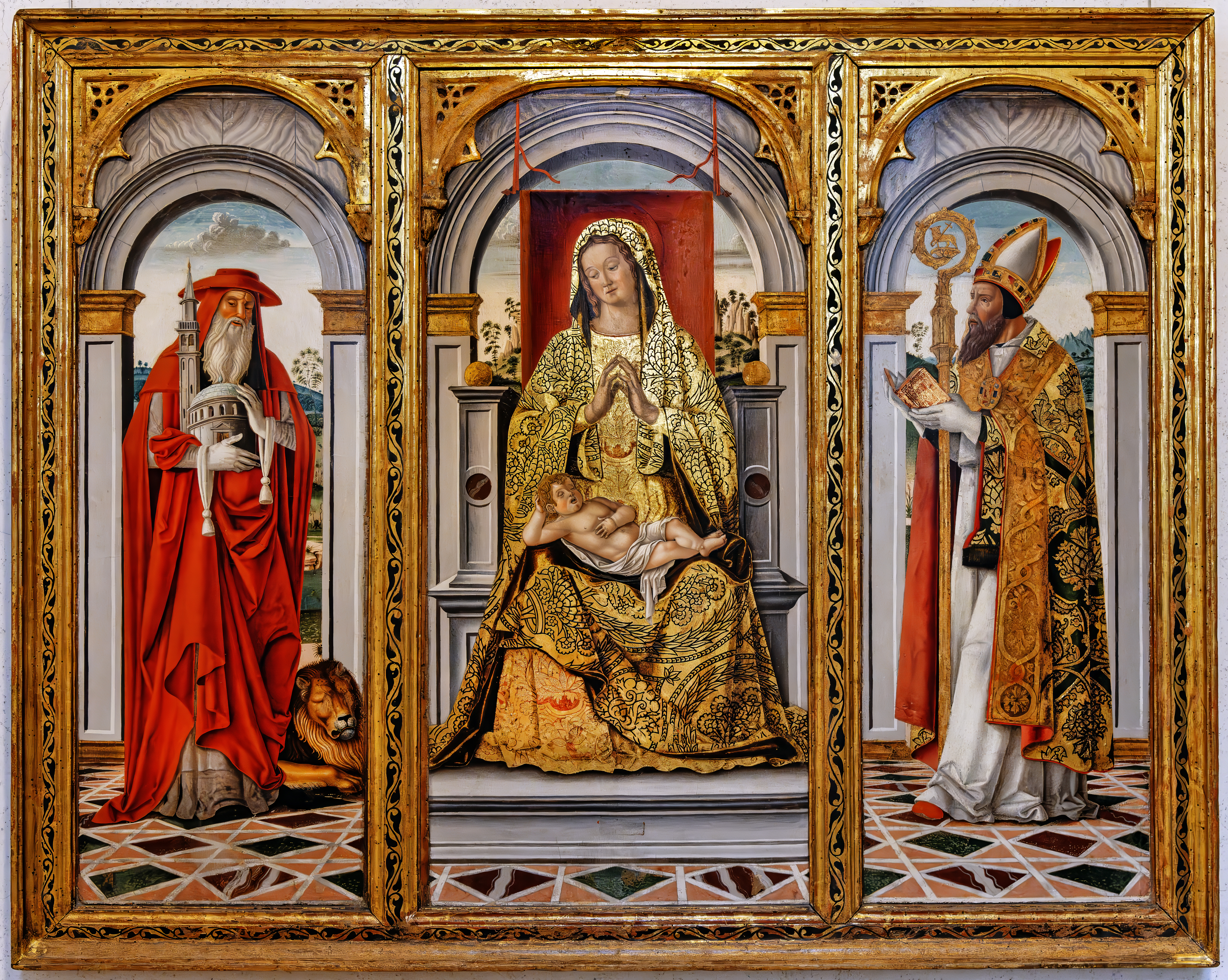
Vergine in trono con Agostino e san Gerolamo, ca 1490, Venezia, Museo Correr

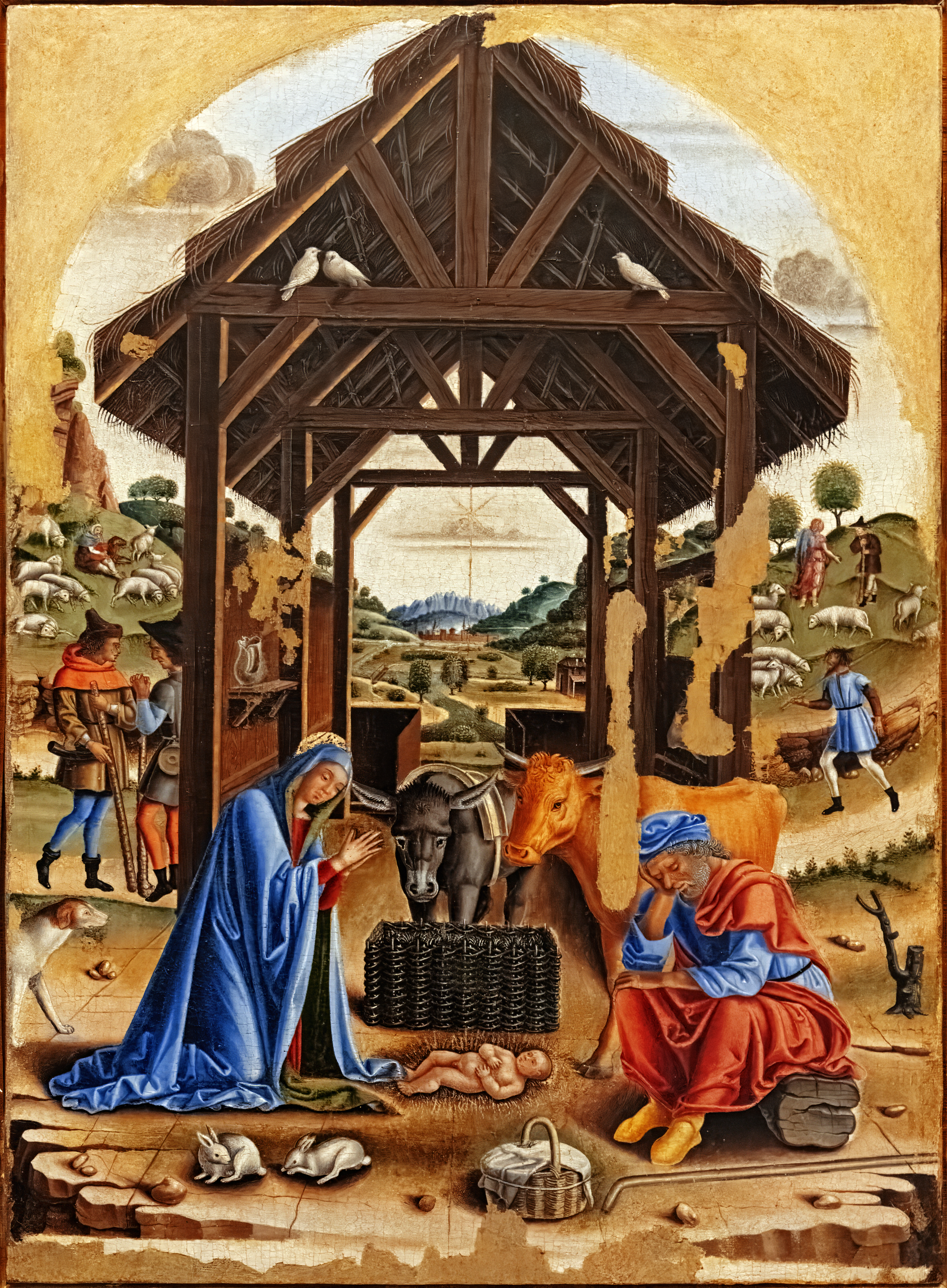
The Nativity - Museo Correr.

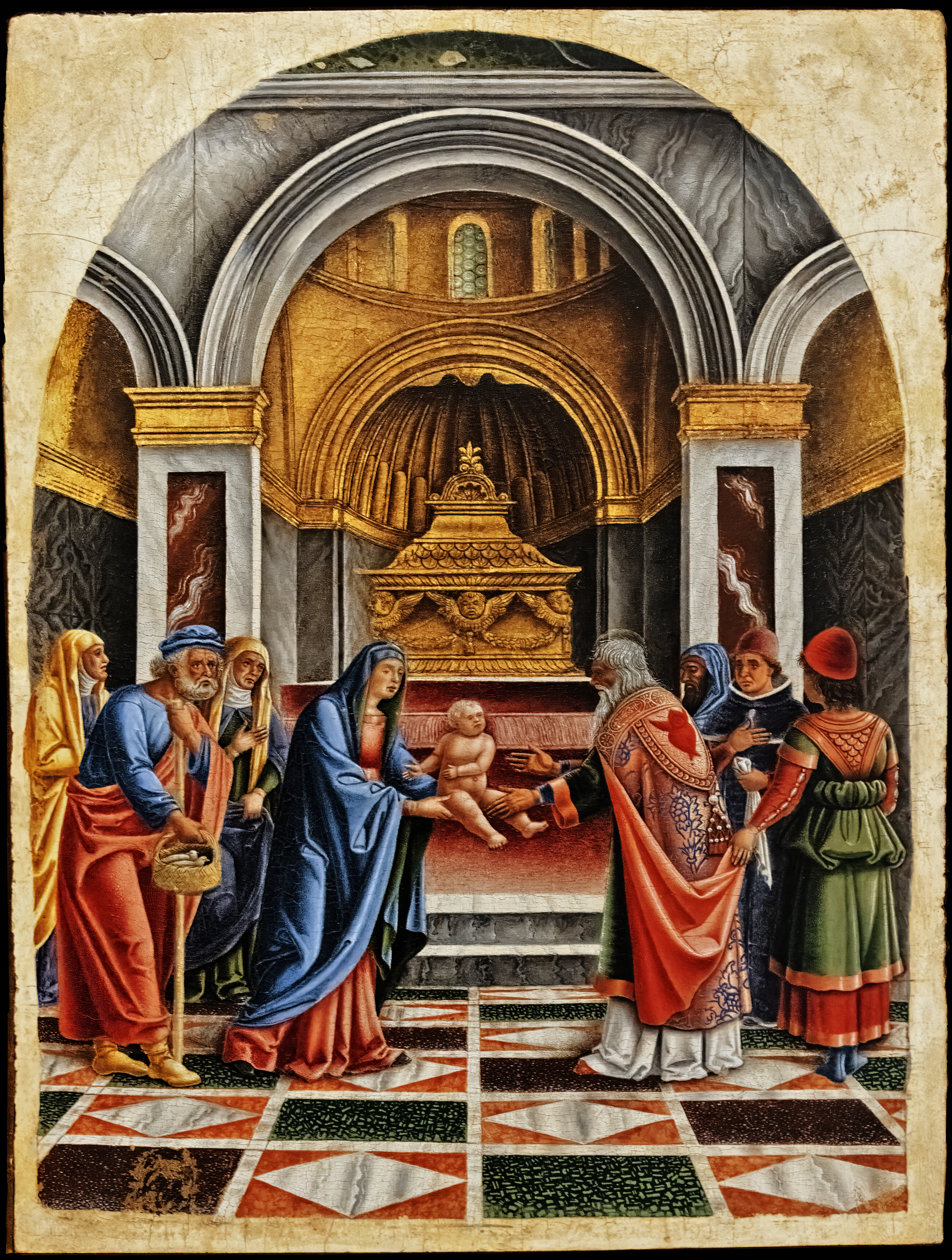
The Presentation at the Temple, ca 1490, Venezia, Museo Correr
