= Resurrection of Jesus in Christian art =

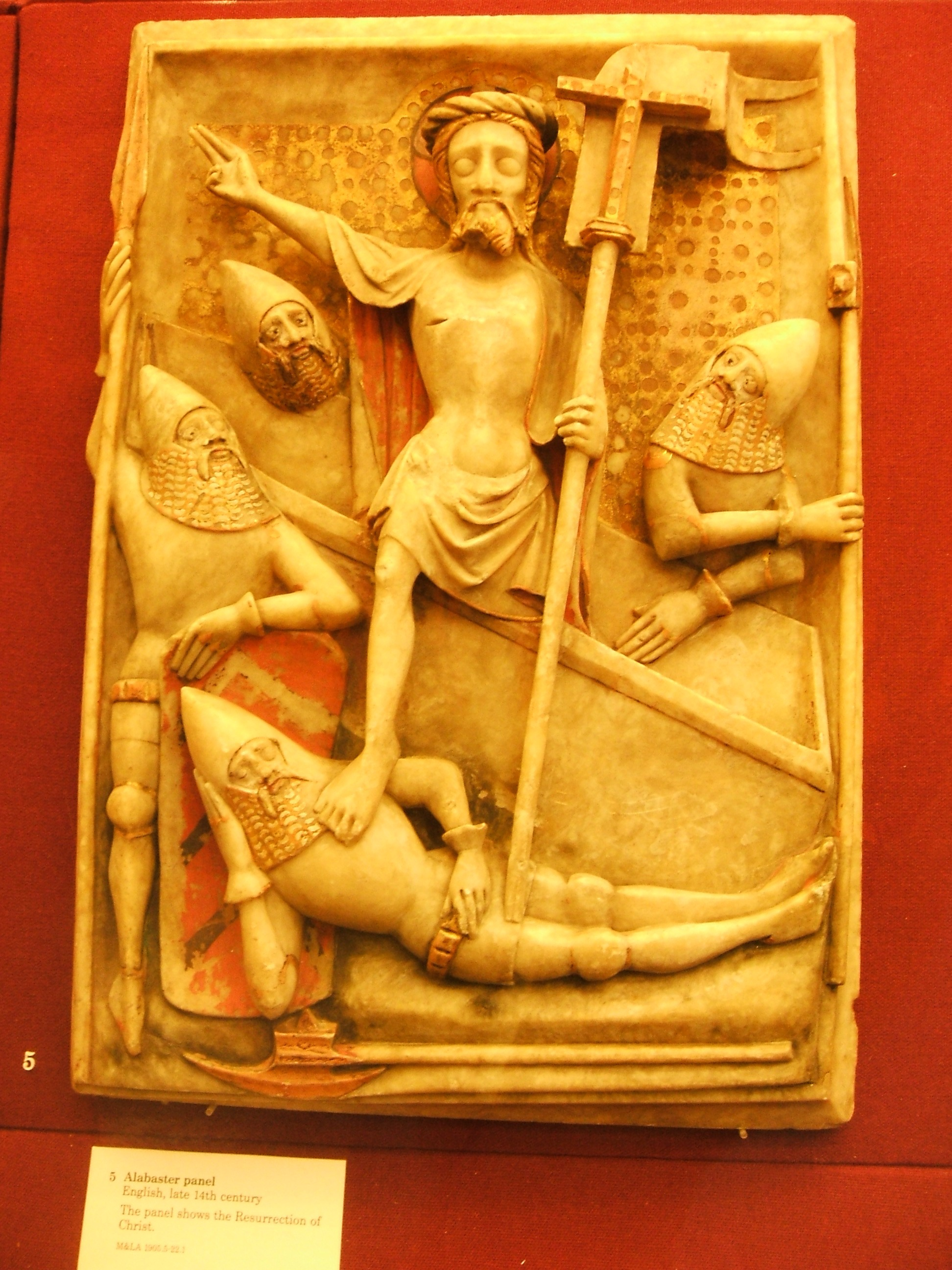
The distinctive English image, with Christ stepping on a soldier, in a 14th-century Nottingham alabaster relief

The resurrection of Jesus has long been central to Christian faith and Christian art, whether as a single scene or as part of a cycle of the Life of Christ. In the teachings of the traditional Christian churches, the sacraments derive their saving power from the passion and resurrection of Christ, upon which the salvation of the world entirely depends. The redemptive value of the resurrection has been expressed through Christian art, as well as being expressed in theological writings.

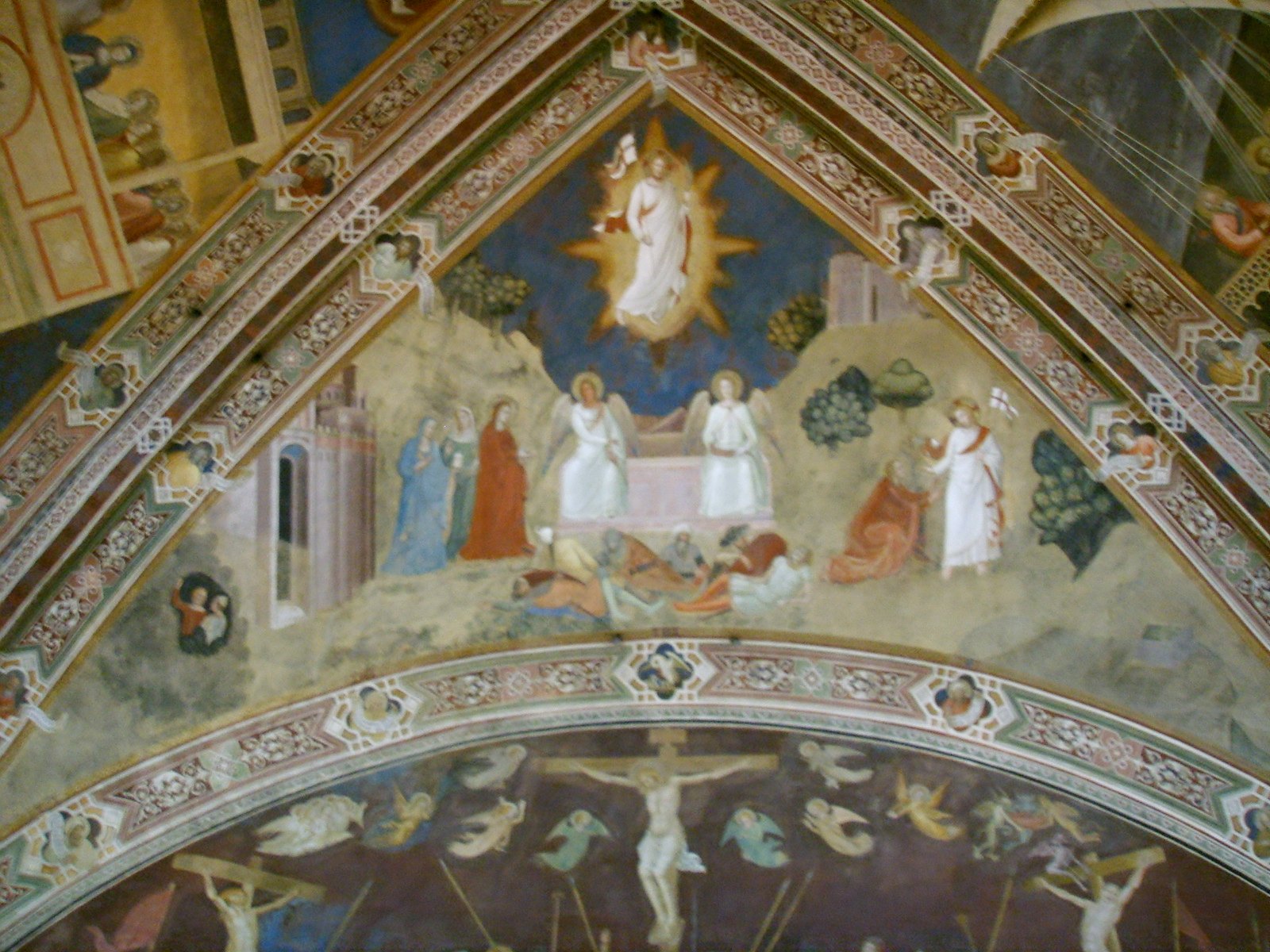
Fresco by Andrea da Firenze, Santa Maria Novella, Florence, 1366, perhaps the earliest "hovering" Christ

However, the moment of the Resurrection is not described as such in the Gospels, and for over a thousand years it was therefore not represented directly in art. Instead at first it was represented by symbolic depictions such as the Chi Rho, the first two Greek letters of Christ, encircled by a wreath symbolizing the victory of resurrection over death. Later various scenes that are described in the Gospels were used, and also the Harrowing of Hell, which is not. In Byzantine and later Eastern Orthodox art this has remained the case, but in the West the depiction of the actual moment of Resurrection became common during the Gothic period.

== Early period ==
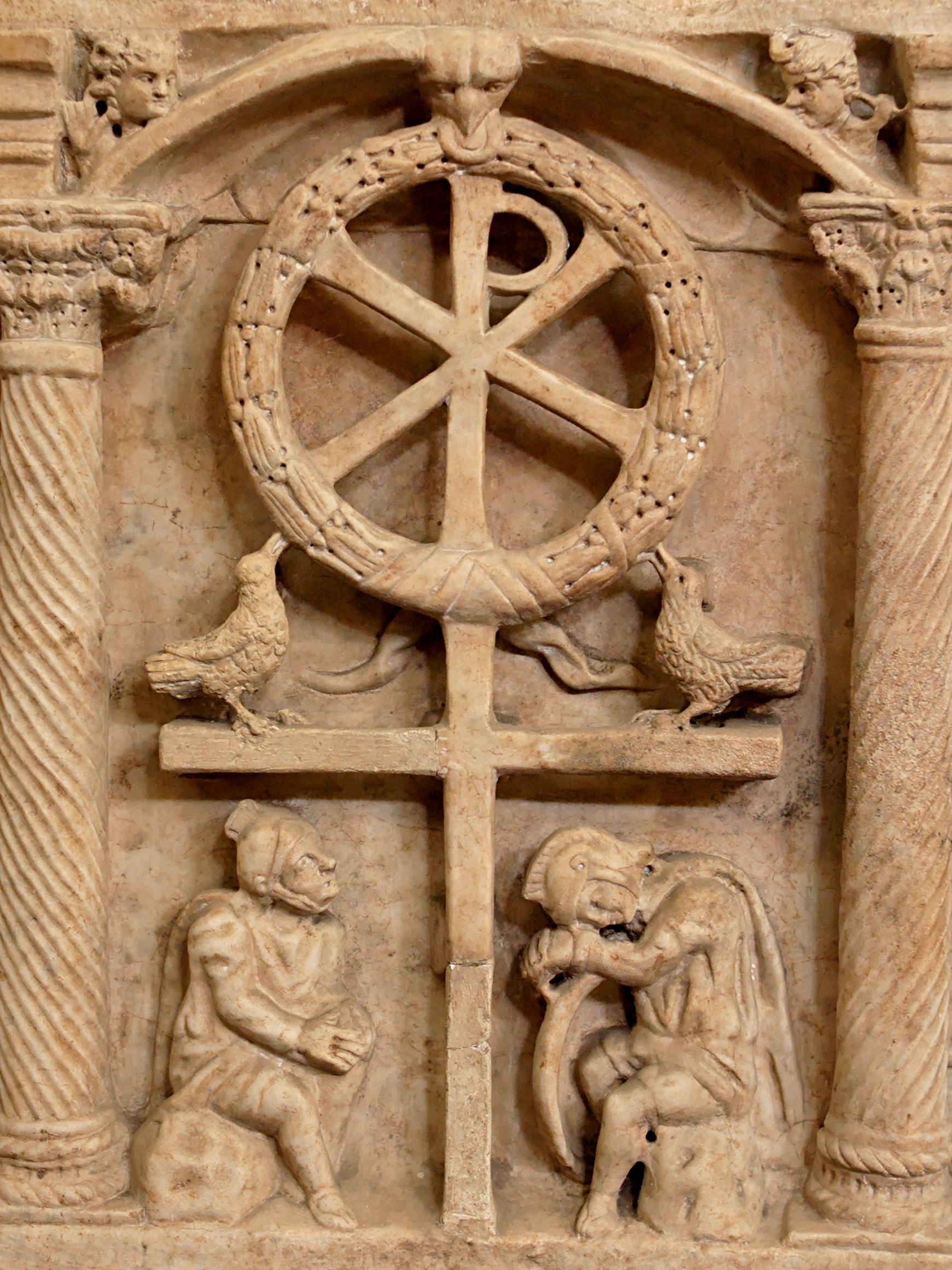
The Chi Rho with a wreath symbolizing the victory of the Resurrection, above Roman soldiers, c. 350

In the Catacombs of Rome, artists just hinted at the Resurrection by using images from the Old Testament such as the fiery furnace and Daniel in the Lion's Den. The period between the year 250 AD and the liberating Edict of Milan in 313 AD saw violent persecutions of Christians under Decius and Diocletian. The most numerous surviving examples of Christian art from this period are paintings in the Catacombs of Rome. The Christians shunned cremation and preferred the practice of interment, to preserve their bodies for the Resurrection of the Dead, as Christ was resurrected from the dead. The depictions of the stories of Daniel and Jonah and the Whale in the Catacombs served as historical and Judaic precedents of salvation.

An early symbol of the resurrection was the wreathed Chi Rho, whose origin traces to the victory of Emperor Constantine I at the Battle of the Milvian Bridge in 312 AD, which he attributed to the use of a cross on the shields of his soldiers. Constantine used the Chi Rho on his standard and his coins showed a labarum with the Chi Rho killing a serpent.

The use of a wreath around the Chi Rho symbolizes the victory of the Resurrection over death, and is an early visual representations of the connection between the Crucifixion of Jesus and his triumphal resurrection, as seen in the 4th-century sarcophagus of Domitilla in Rome. Here, in the wreathed Chi Rho the death and resurrection of Christ are shown as inseparable, and the Resurrection is not merely a happy ending tucked at the end of the life of Christ on earth. Given the use of similar symbols on the Roman standard, this depiction also conveyed another victory, namely that of the Christian faith: the Roman soldiers who had once arrested Jesus and marched him to Calvary now walked under the banner of a resurrected Christ.

== Christology and iconography ==
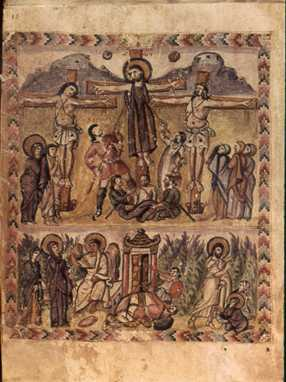
The earliest crucifixion in an illuminated manuscript, from the Rabbula Gospels, also shows the resurrection.

The development of iconography of the Resurrection occurred at the same time as the ecumenical councils of the 4th, 5th and 6th centuries, that were specifically devoted to Christology. The next stage in the development of the image was the use of the secondary event of the visit of the Three Marys (usually two in early depictions), or the Myrrhbearers as they are known in Eastern Orthodoxy, at the empty tomb of Jesus to convey the concept of the Resurrection; this was included in all four Gospels. One of the earliest depictions of the scene is an ivory plaque of c. 400 AD, already including the sleeping guards who were to become a standard element in later depictions, with an Ascension scene above.

The late 6th-century Rabbula Gospel book which includes one of the earliest Crucifixion sequences in a manuscript also depicts an empty tomb under the Crucifixion panel, with an angel seated there who greets two women. Rays of light strike down Roman soldiers, and Jesus greets the two women, who kneel to adore him. Several of the 6th-century pilgrimage souvenir Monza ampullae show the two women and angel, reflecting the scene pilgrims to Christ's tomb saw in the Church of the Holy Sepulchre in Jerusalem, including a quasi-liturgical re-enactment of this scene apparently staged there. From the second half of the 7th century, depictions of a risen Christ walking in the garden start to appear in conjunction with the two women and the angel in Western art. Later depictions of the Women at the Sepulchre have also apparently been influenced by quasi-liturgical re-enactments; in Western monasteries monks dressed as the angel and the women and re-enacted the scene on Easter morning, which was called the Visitatio.

Other scenes from the Gospels are the Noli me tangere, where Mary Magdalen mistakes Christ for a gardener, the scene of Doubting Thomas, and the Meal at Emmaus, the first post-Resurrection scene in the Gospel of Luke. The famous Romanesque reliefs of c. 1100 in the cloister of the Abbey of Santo Domingo de Silos devote large panels to both the Doubting Thomas scene, enacted with not only all the Apostles present, but also St Paul, and the Meeting on the Road to Emmaus. These two scenes, preceded by a Crucifixion and Deposition and followed by a Pentecost and Ascension, are the only large panels in the Romanesque phase of work. Occasionally other scenes are shown; in John 20:3–10 he is the first to check that the tomb is empty. A capital in Toulouse shows the empty tomb with John peering in from behind a column, and raising his hand in astonishment. The Resurrection was also referred to by showing typological parallels, such as Jonah and the Whale (which was supported by Matthew 12:38–41 and Luke 11:29–32), the Resurrection of Lazarus, and other Old Testament episodes.

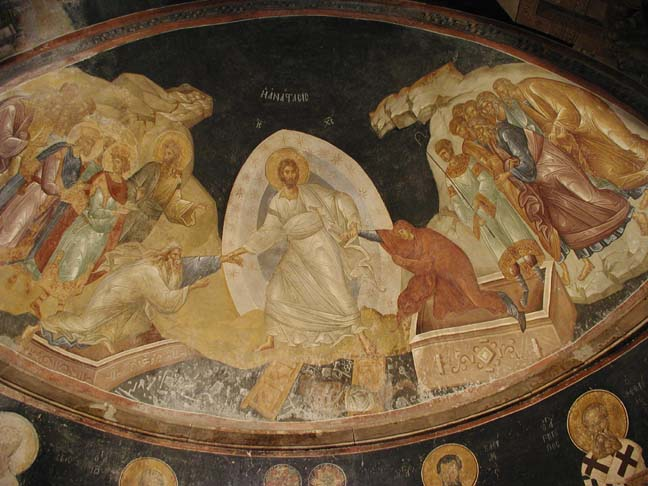
Raising Adam and Eve, with Satan is bound in Hell, Chora Church, Istanbul, c. 1315

Between the 6th and 9th centuries, the iconography of the Resurrection in the Eastern Church was influenced by the iconography of the Transfiguration, given that there was no scriptural guidance for the depiction of the Resurrection scene. In traditional Orthodox iconography the actual moment of the Resurrection of Christ ("Anabasis") is never depicted, unlike the treatment of the raising of Lazarus. The icons do not depict the moment of the Resurrection, but show the Myrrhbearers, or the Harrowing of Hell. Usually the resurrected Christ is rescuing Adam and Eve, and often other figures, symbolizing the salvation of humanity. His posture is often very active, paralleling the Western depictions that show him climbing out of the tomb.

The cosmic significance of the Resurrection in Western theology goes back to Saint Ambrose who in the 4th century said that "In Christ the world has risen, heaven has risen, the earth has risen". However, this theme was only developed later in Western theology and art. It was, a different matter in the East where the Resurrection was linked to redemption, and the renewal and rebirth of the whole world from a much earlier period. In art this was symbolized by combining the depictions of the Resurrection with the Harrowing of Hell in icons and paintings. A good example is from the Chora Church in Istanbul, where John the Baptist, Solomon and other figures are also present, depicting that Christ was not alone in the resurrection. The depiction sequence at the 10th-century Hosios Loukas monastery in Greece shows Christ wearing a new tunic, with gold lines, after he has broken through the gates of Hell. Christ then he pulls Adam, followed by Eve from his tomb, signifying the salvation of humanity after the resurrection.

== Direct representation ==
From the 12th century the Resurrection itself begins to appear regularly in the West, with Christ shown emerging from what is normally shown as a Roman-style sarcophagus placed on the ground. Sometimes his torso is shown above the top edge of the sarcophagus, but more often he stands on top of it, or places one foot on the edge. The slab has always been removed (by an angel, though they are rarely shown), and may lie to one side of the scene at a diagonal angle. The iconography showing Christ stepping out of a sarcophagus, and placing his foot on one of the sleeping soldiers is first found in English alabaster reliefs. Like many aspects of Resurrection imagery, it may have drawn on medieval drama, which evolved complex traditions for dramatizing the event, including laments by the women at the tomb, and sub-plots involving the soldiers.

Showing Christ "hovering" above the tomb was an Italian innovation of the Trecento, and remained mostly found in Italian art until the late 15th century. One of the claimants to be the earliest surviving works to show this iconography is the well-known fresco by Andrea da Firenze in the Spanish Chapel of the Basilica of Santa Maria Novella in Florence, which dates to 1366. While earlier Northern artists showed Christ rising out of the tomb, but still with his feet on the ground, or the tomb itself, Matthias Grünewald's Isenheim Altarpiece (1505–1516) has a striking composition with Christ hovering in mid-air, which was already common in Italy, for example in a Raphael altarpiece of about 1500 (see gallery) and works by Titian and many others. Sometimes Christ is framed by a mandorla

Representations of the resurrection continued to evolve in the Renaissance, though the cross-banner in Christ's hand, representing victory over death, was often retained. In Pietro Perugino's depiction at the Vatican the tomb has a conventional style. Leonardo da Vinci used a rock-hewn cave. The "Resurrection cross" or "Triumphal cross" (Crux longa in Latin) is a simple, somewhat long, shaft crossed at the top from which a banner may float. Christ bears this in his hand in many depictions, as his standard of power, and the conqueror over death and Hell. However this must be distinguished from the shaft depicted in the hand of Saint John the Baptist which is a reed. The banner on the Triumphal cross is usually white and has a red cross, symbolizing the victory of the resurrected Christ over death. The symbol derived from the 4th century vision of the Roman Emperor Constantine the Great and his use of a cross on the Roman Standard.

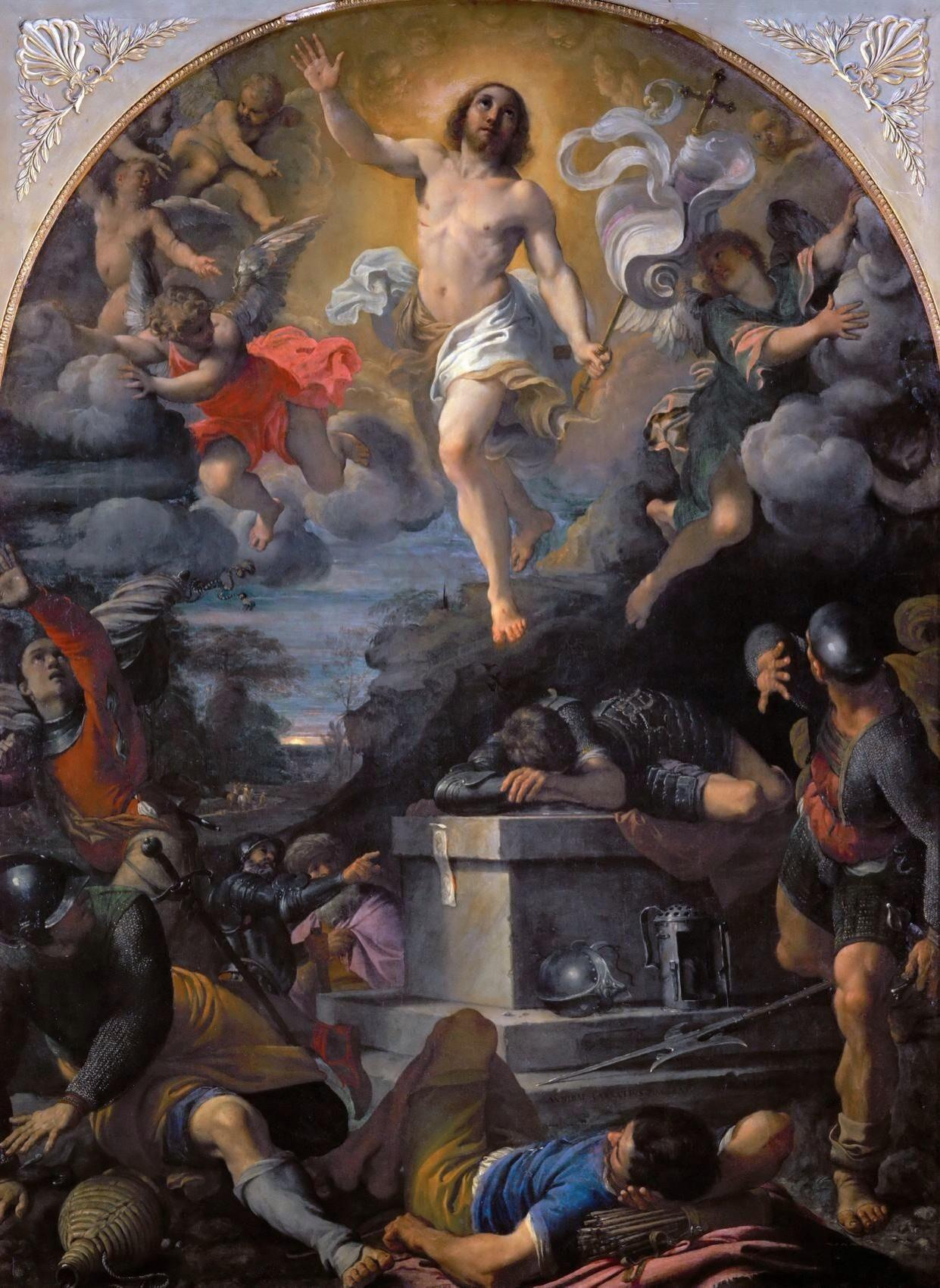
Resurrection of Christ, Annibale Carracci, 1593, Louvre

The Council of Trent (1545–1563) objected to the floating or hovering depictions, and demanded a return to the older conception, with Christ's feet firmly on the ground, either stepping out of a sarcophagus, or standing upright, holding a banner. This was generally followed, at least until the 19th century. However, Tintoretto's 1565 depiction at his former parish church of San Cassiano (Venice) still shows the figure of Christ as floating above the tomb.

Depictions of the Resurrection continued into the Baroque period, with Rubens producing two paintings in 1611 and 1635 in which the triumphant figure of a resurrected Christ dominates the space. As in other religious subjects, after Tiepolo and his Spanish imitators, the momentum in producing religious art was lost. However, the depiction of the Resurrection continues to be a major theme in Christian churches, e.g. as in the 19th-century Rosary Basilica in Lourdes, France.

== Paintings with articles ==
- Třeboň Altarpiece, by Master of the Třeboň Altarpiece, Bohemia, c. 1380, now Prague
- Seilern Triptych, 1410–25, attr. Robert Campin, London
- The Resurrection (Piero della Francesca), 1460s, Sansepolcro
- Massa Fermana Altarpiece by Carlo Crivelli (predella scene), 1468
- Resurrection of Christ (Bellini), c. 1475, Berlin
- Resurrection of Christ (Bermejo), c. 1475, Barcelona
- Descent into Limbo (Mantegna), 1492, Bergamo
- San Francesco al Prato Resurrection, Perugino, c. 1499, Vatican
- Resurrection of Christ (Raphael), 1499–1502, São Paulo Museum of Art
- Lamentation over the Dead Christ (Signorelli) (background), 1502, Cortona
- Florence Charterhouse, fresco by Pontormo, c. 1523-25
- Resurrection (Annibale Carracci), 1593, Louvre
- Resurrection (Rubens, Antwerp), 1611-12
- Resurrection (Rubens, Florence), c. 1616
- Resurrection (Cecco del Caravaggio), 1619, Chicago

== Gallery of art ==
=== Eastern Church ===
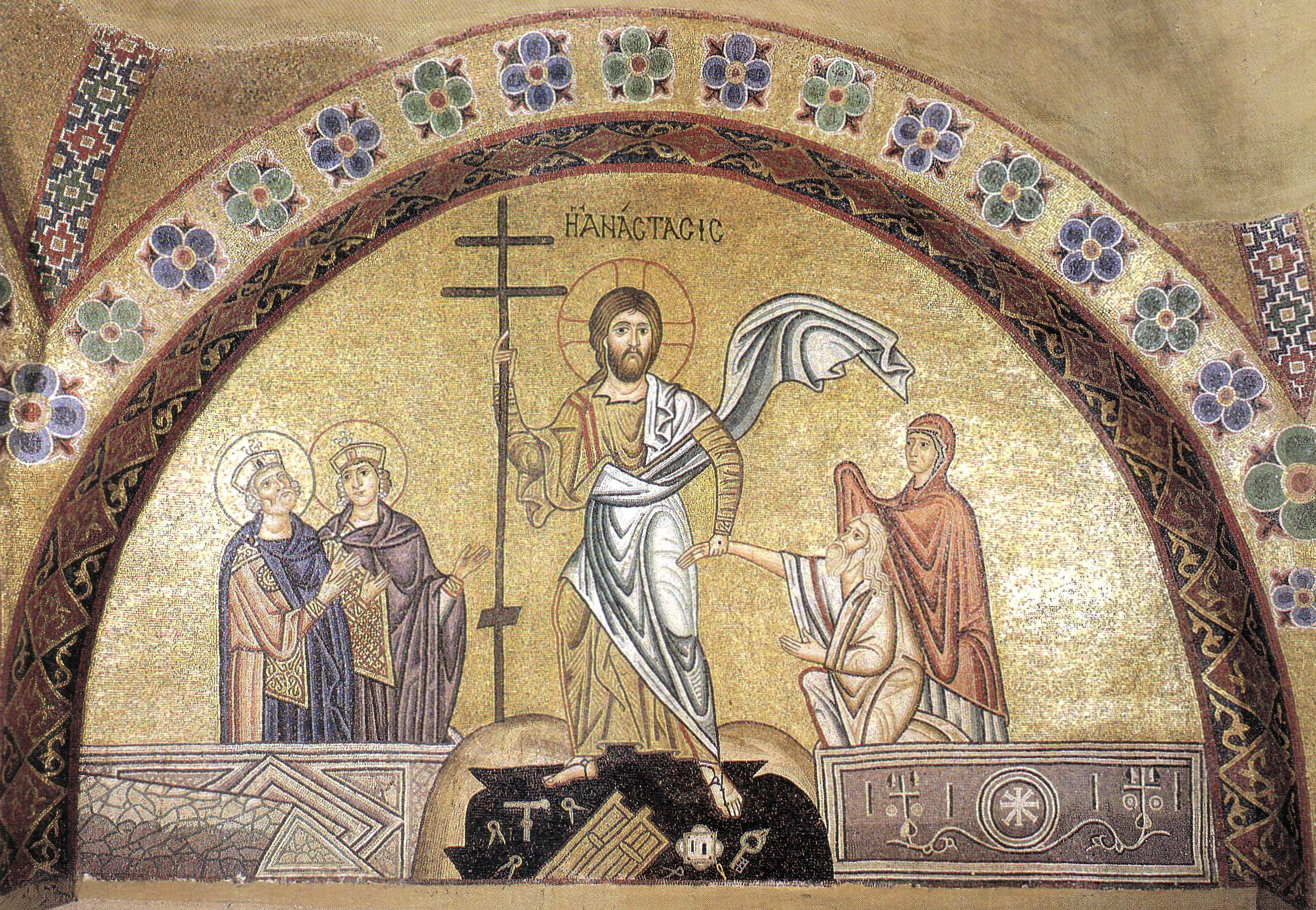
Hosios Loukas, Greece, 11th century

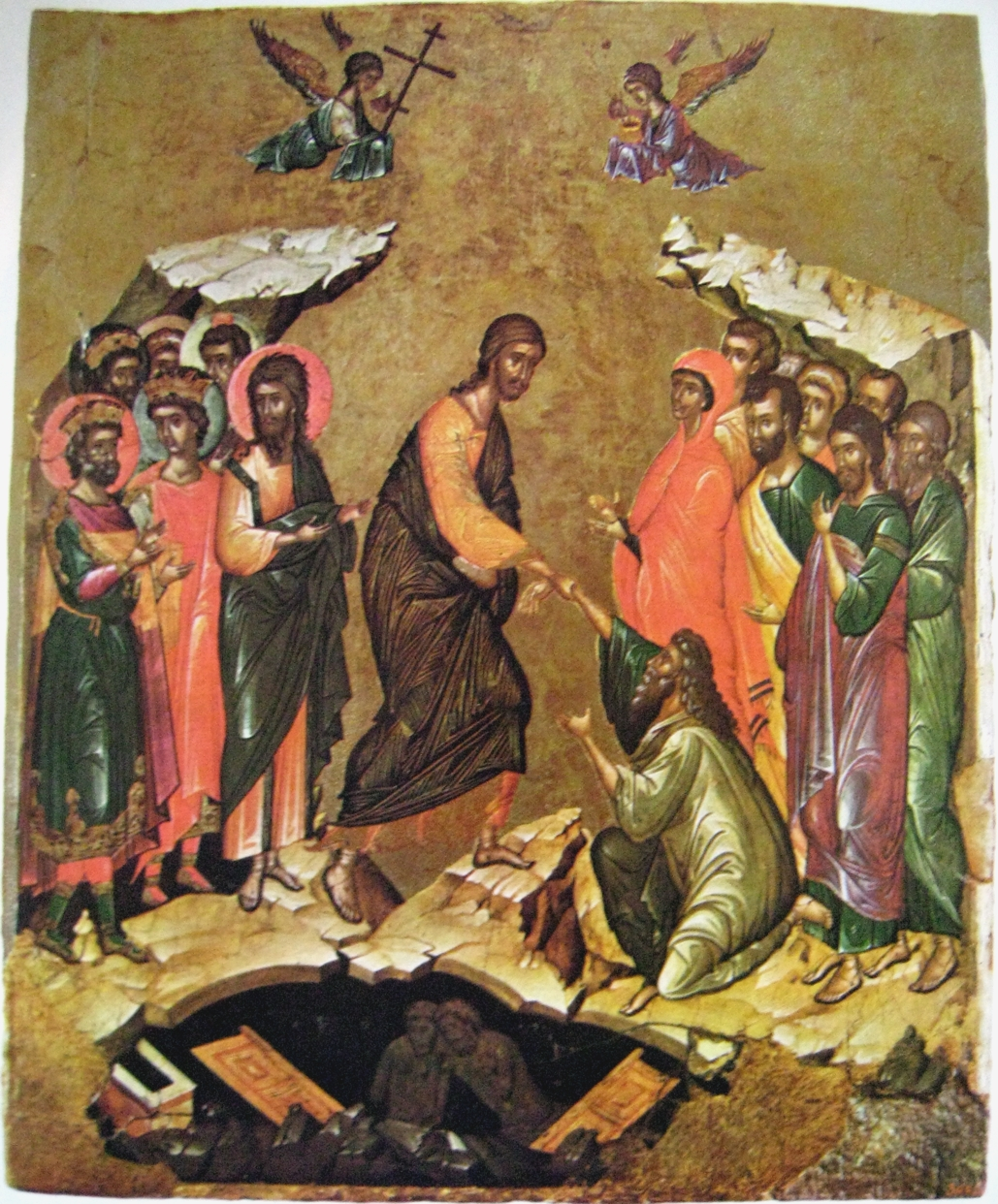
Russian icon, 15th century

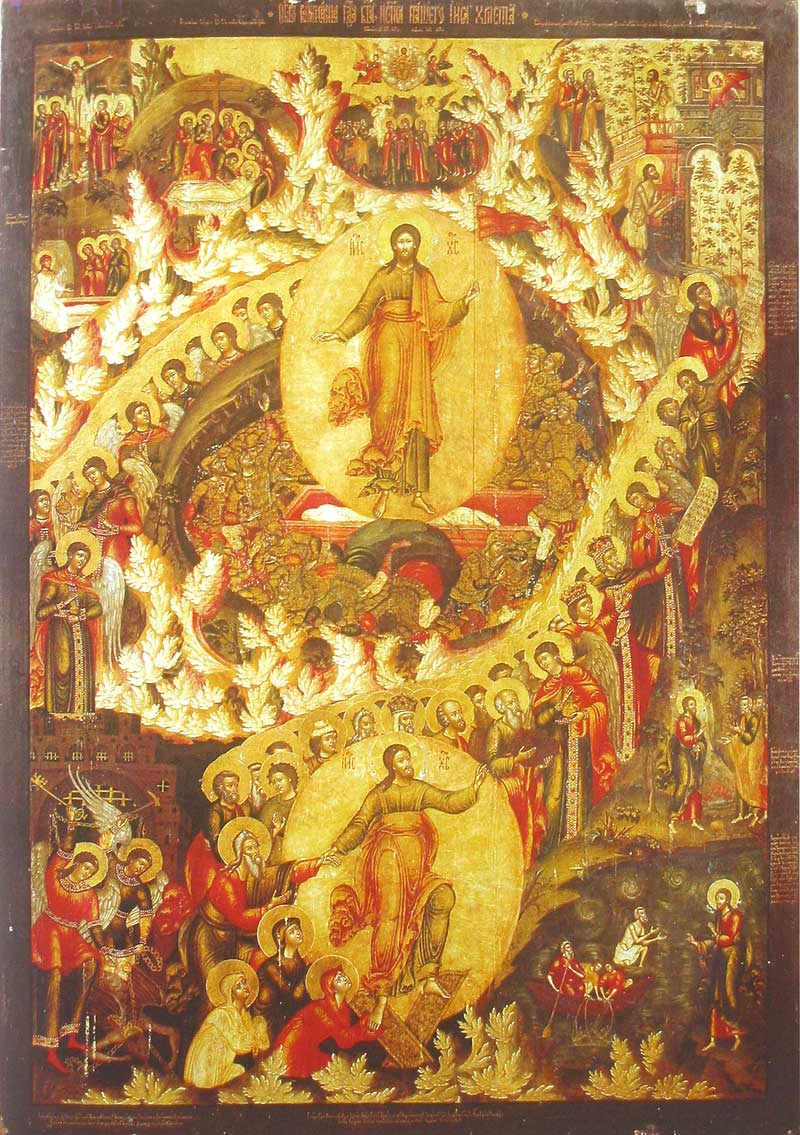
Yaroslavl school, 17th century

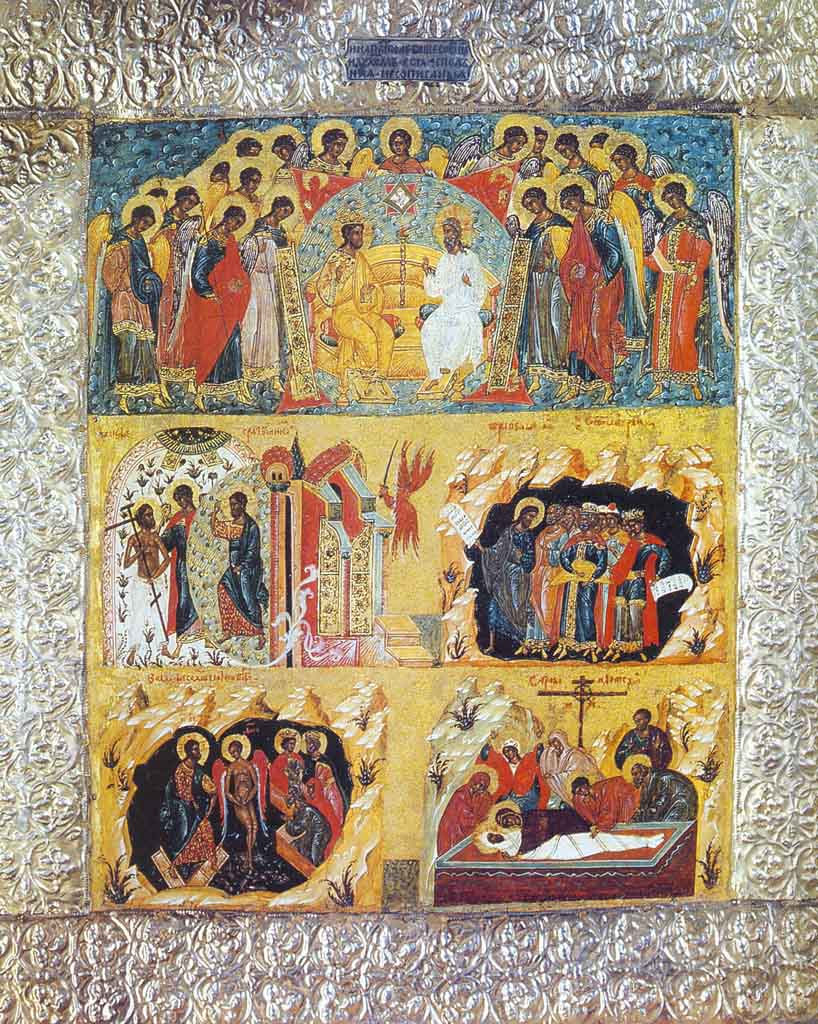
Five part icon, Solovetsky Monastery, 17th century

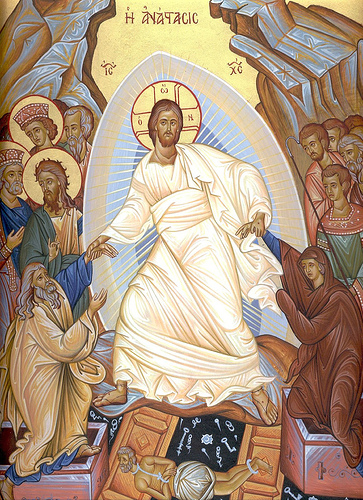
Modern Greek icon

=== Western Church ===
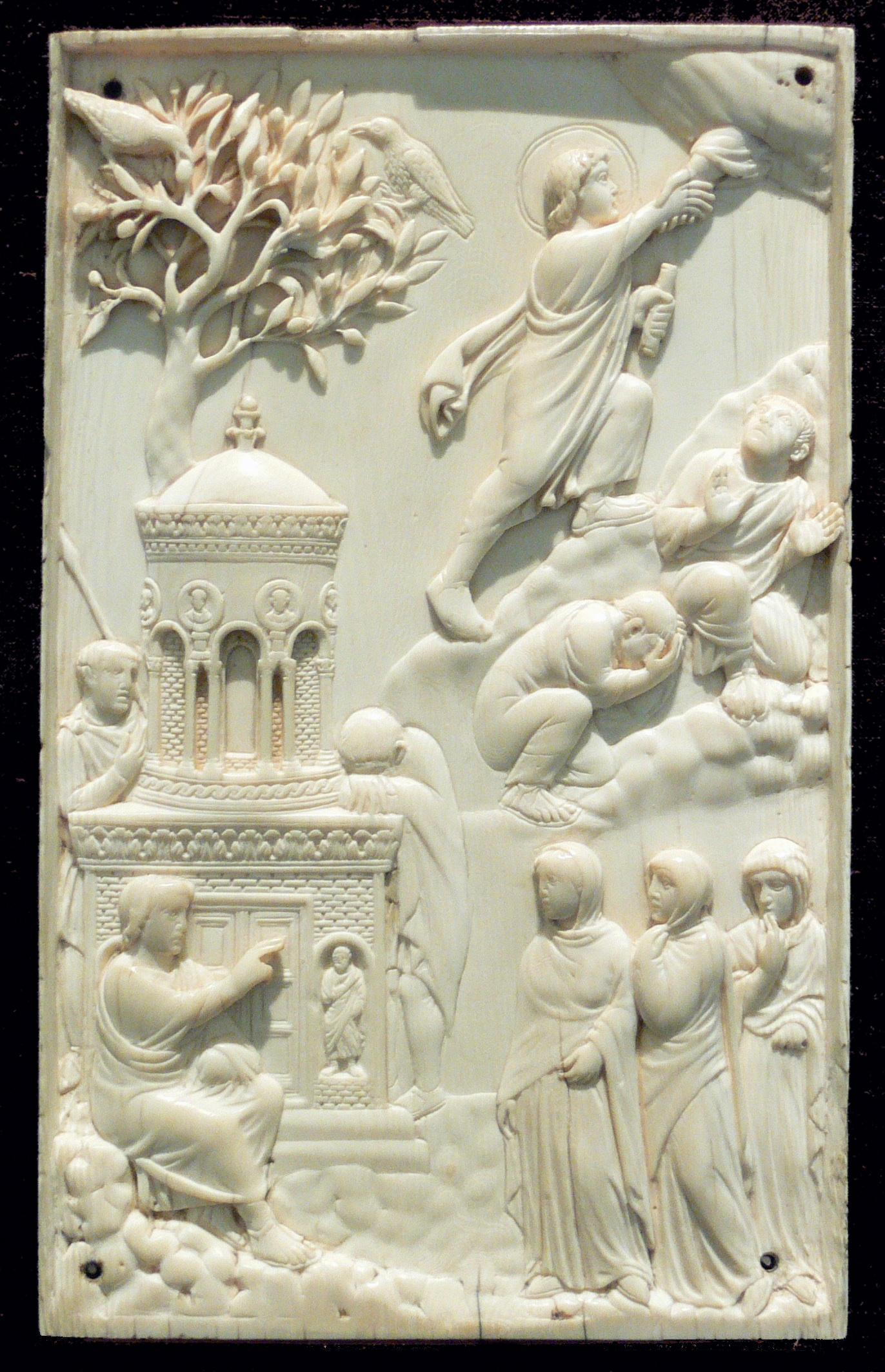
Ivory cover c. 400, already with sleeping soldiers; Ascension above

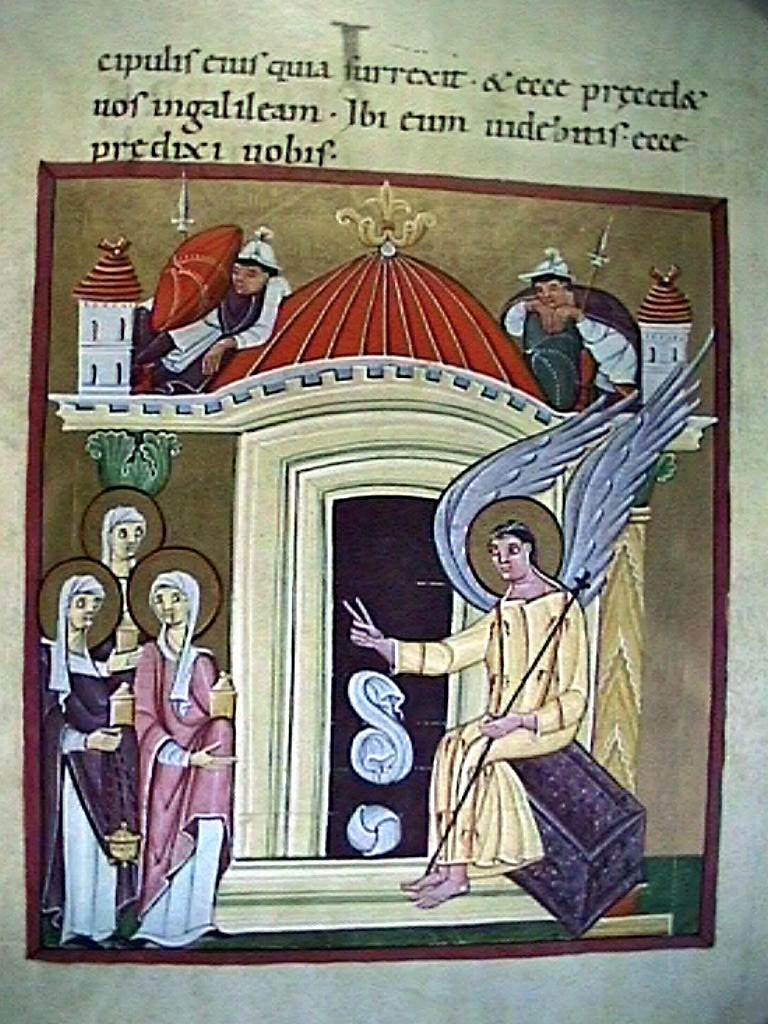
The Ottonian Bamberg Apocalypse, 11th century

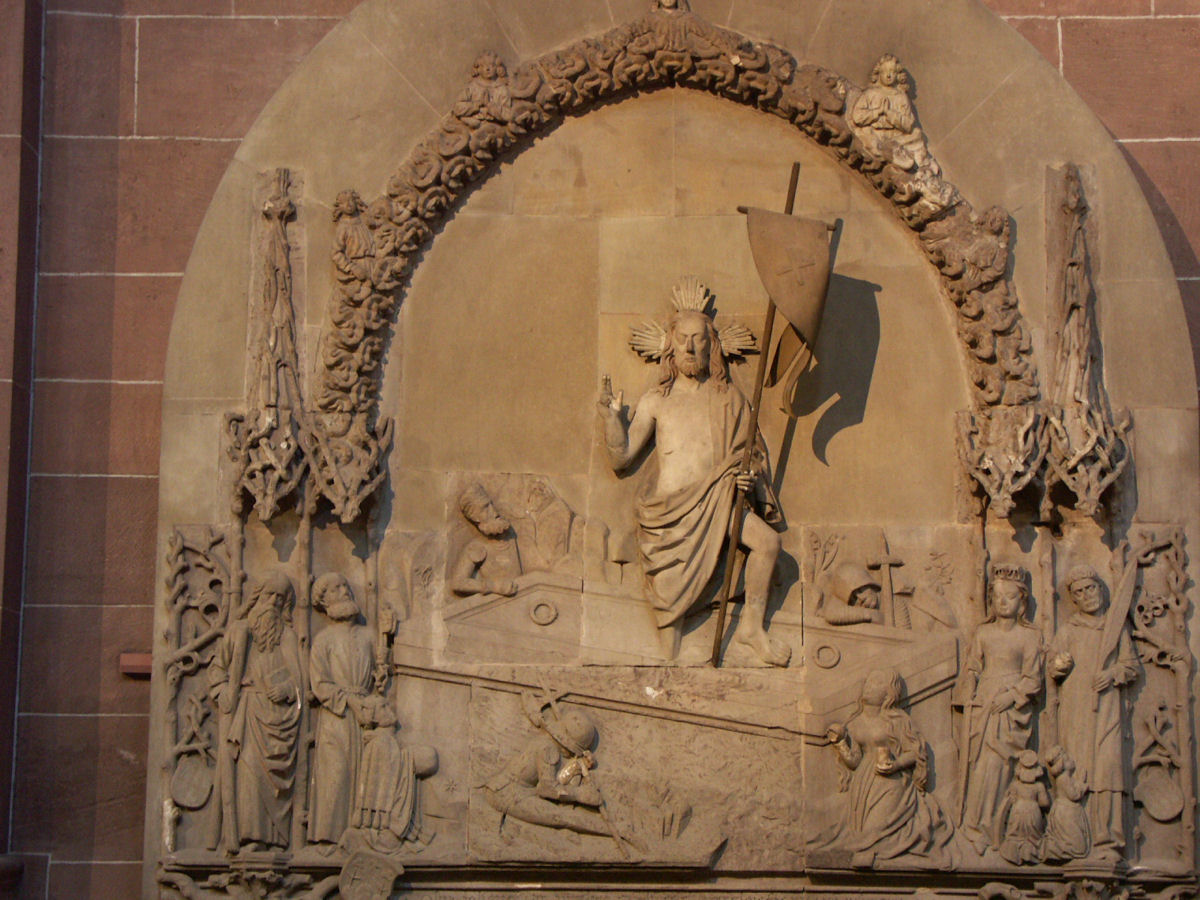
Gothic version, from Worms Cathedral

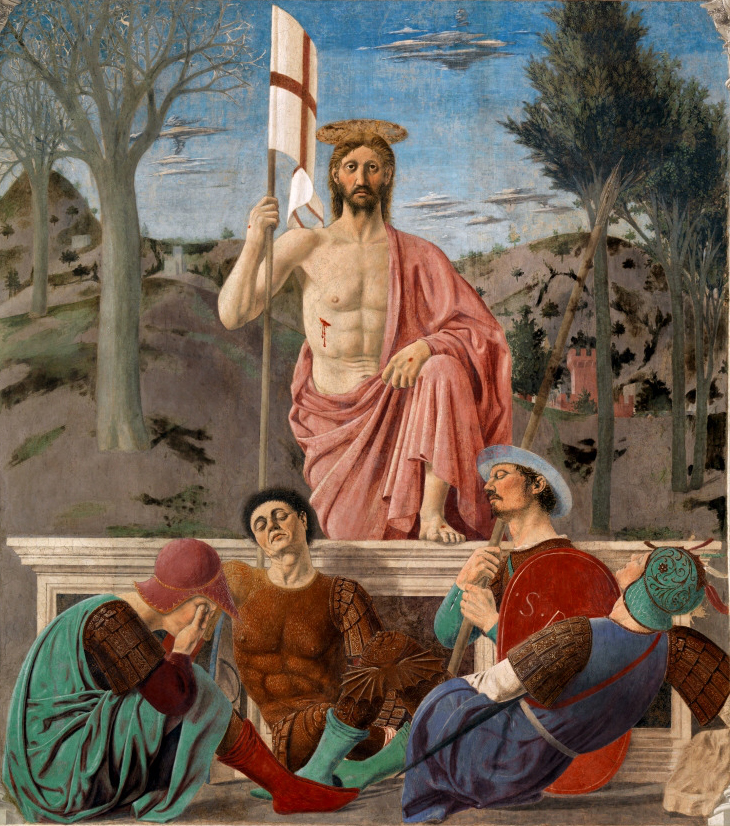
Piero della Francesca, 15th century

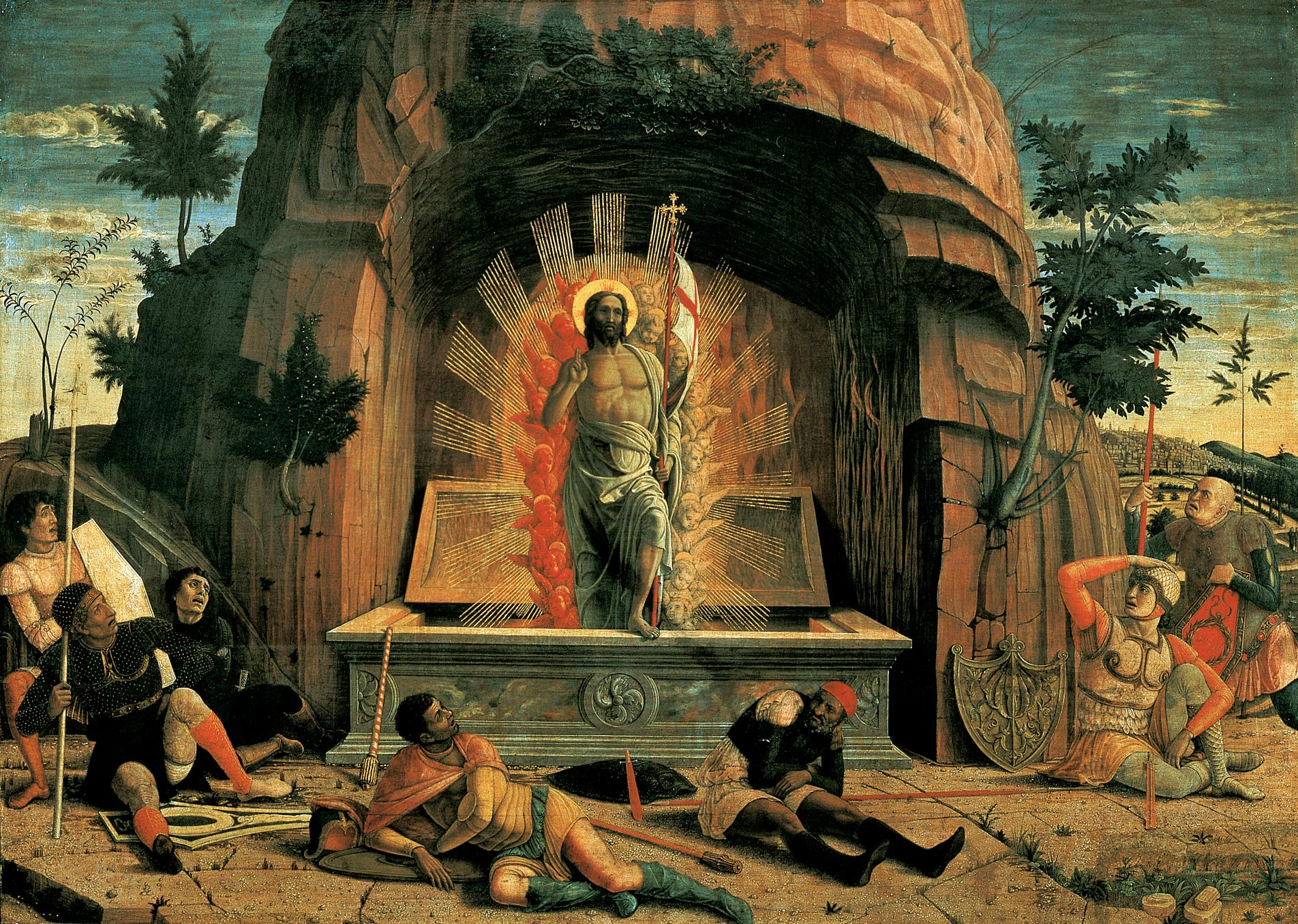
Andrea Mantegna, 1457–1459

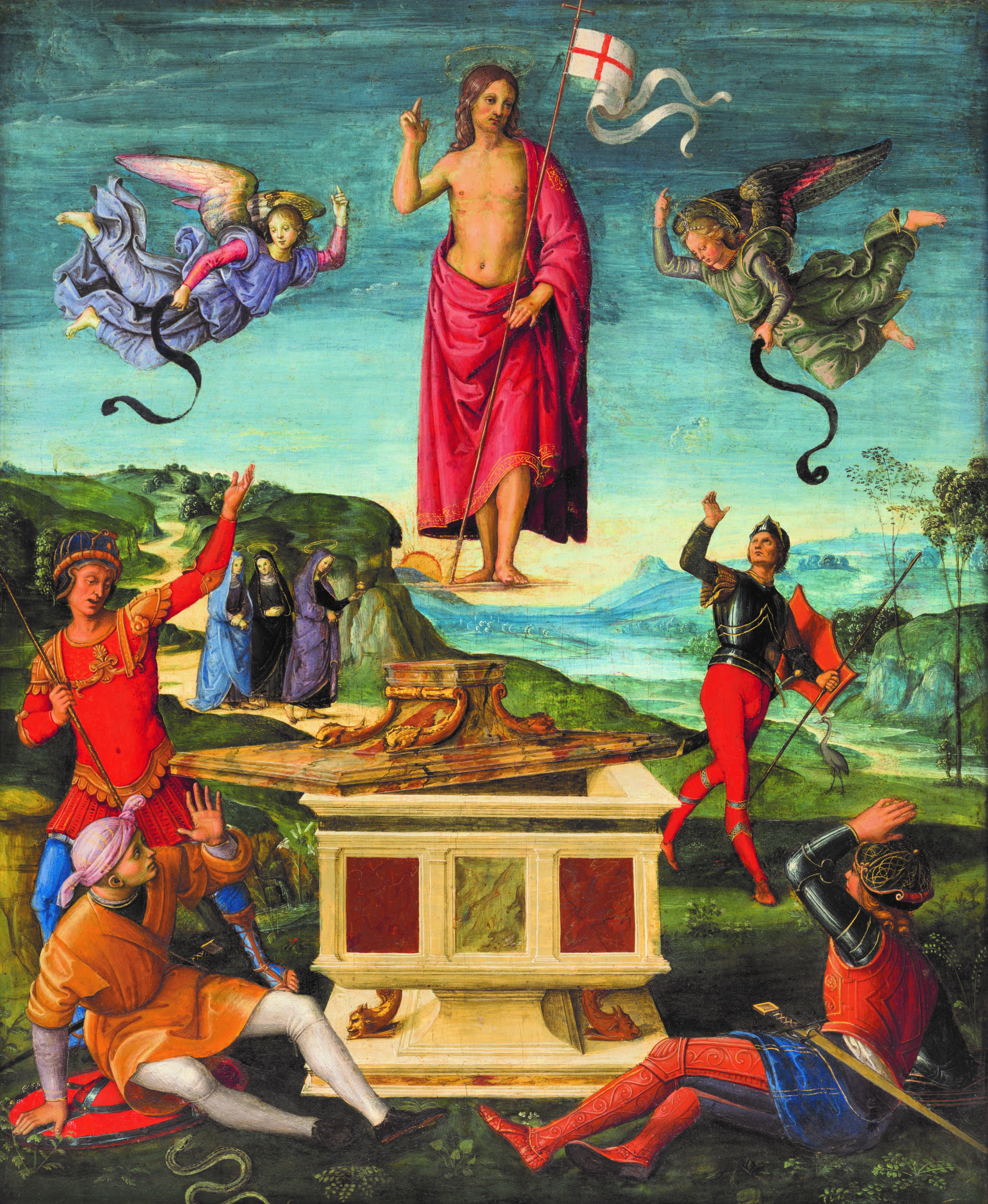
Raphael, Resurrection of Christ, 1499–1502

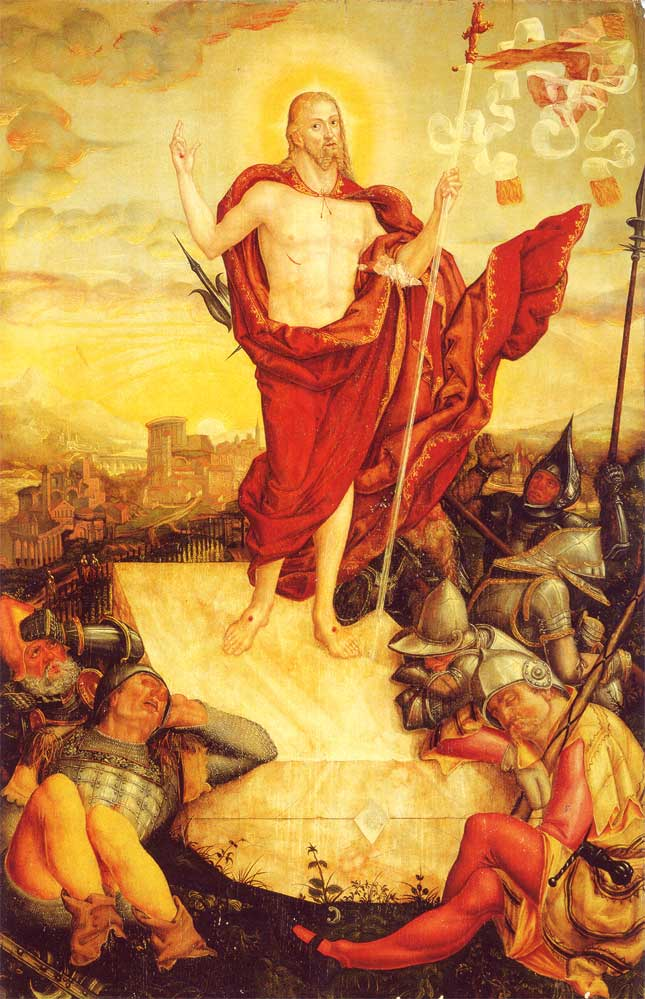
Lucas Cranach, 1558

Rubens, 1611

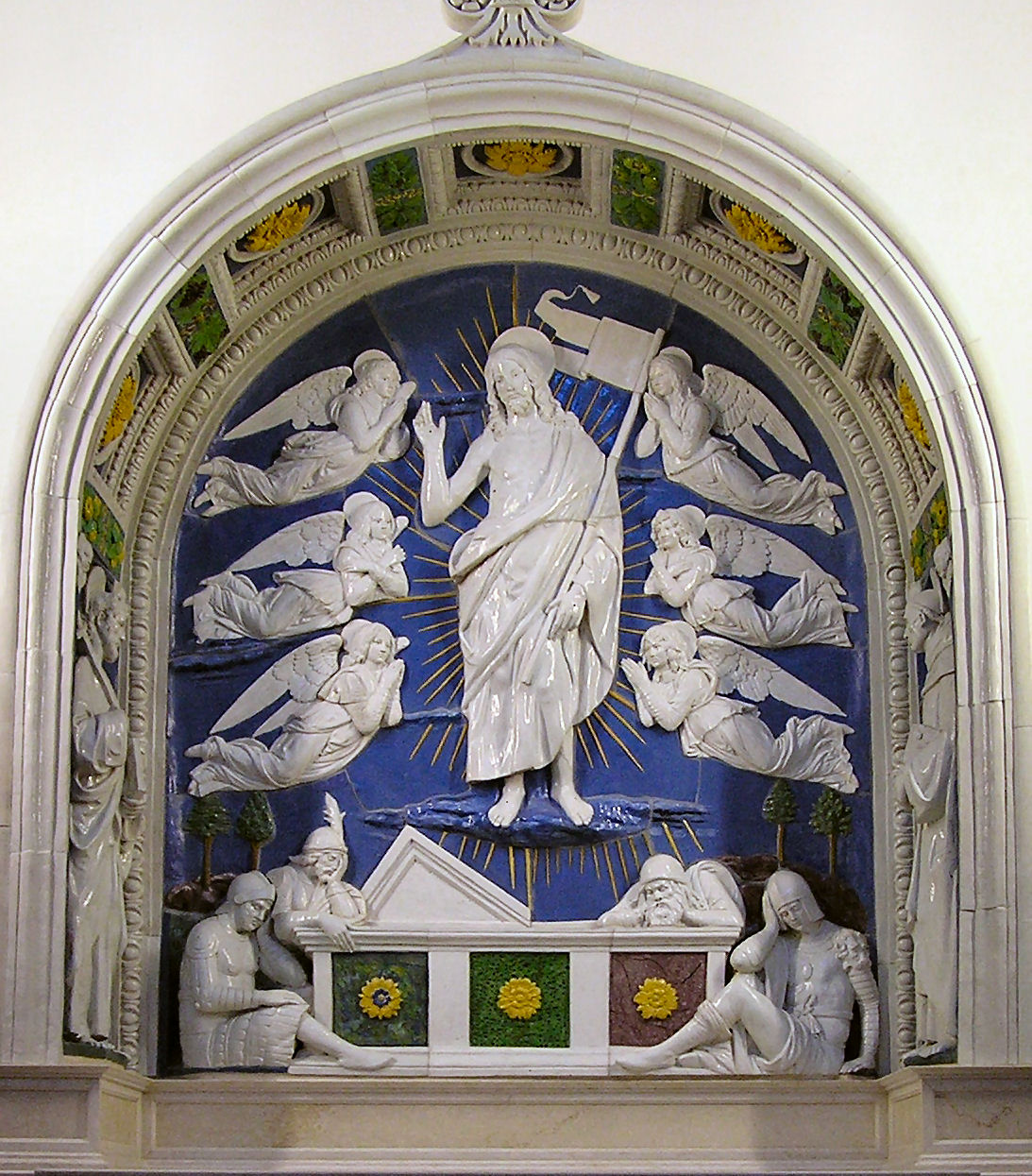
Andrea della Robbia, 16th century

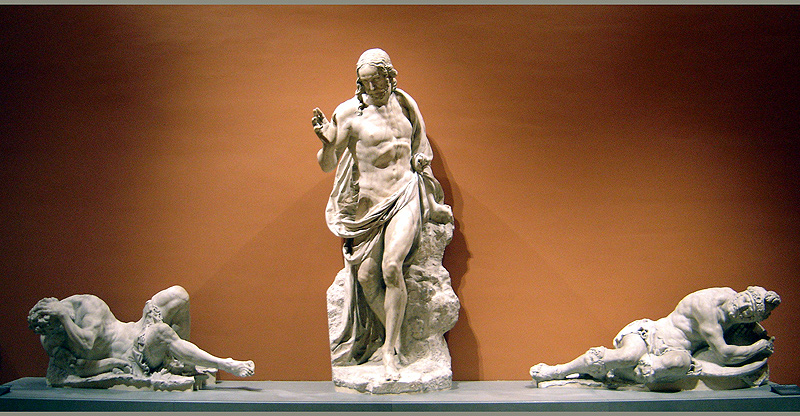
Germain Pilon, 1572

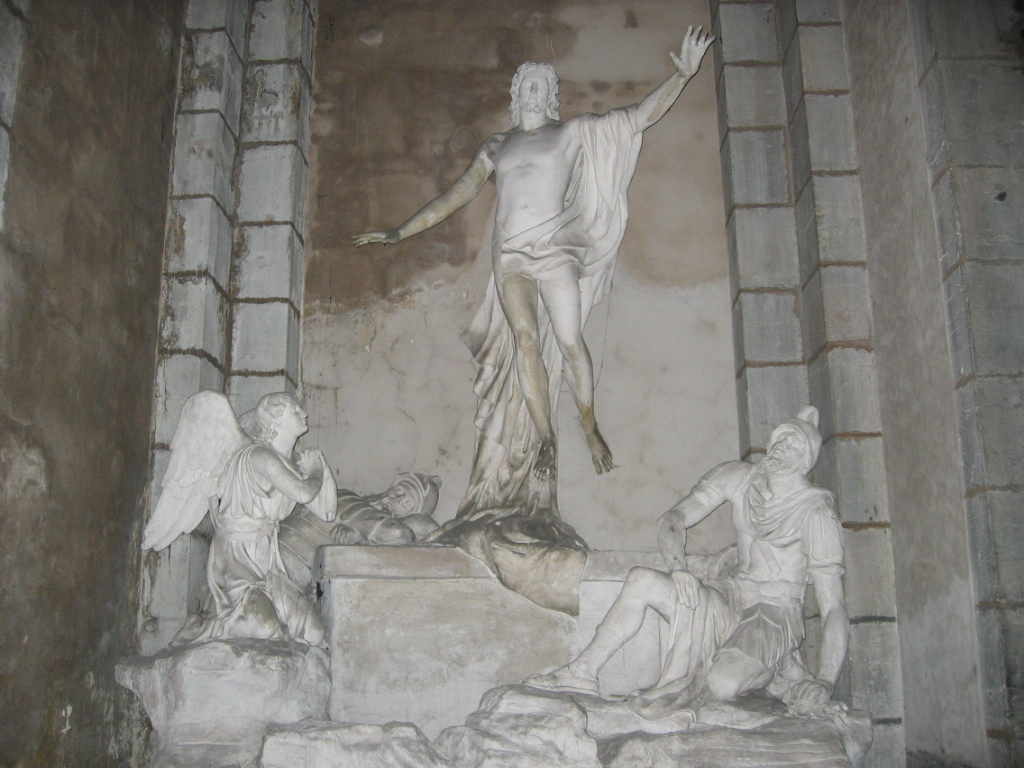
Auguste Clésinger, 19th century

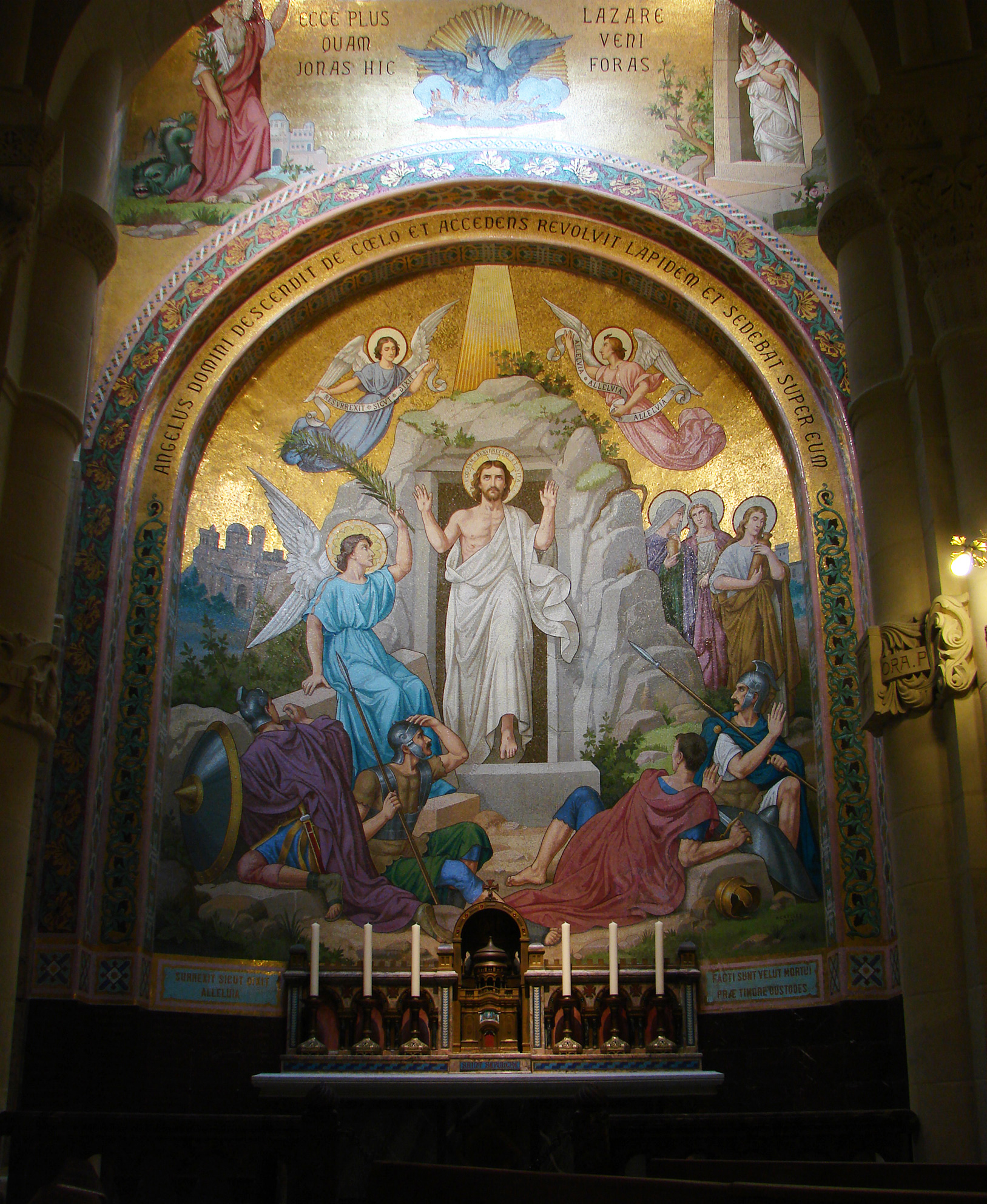
Rosary Basilica, Lourdes, 19th century, mosaic

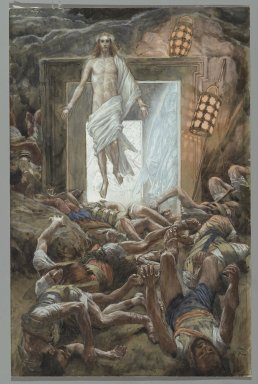
James Tissot, c. 1890

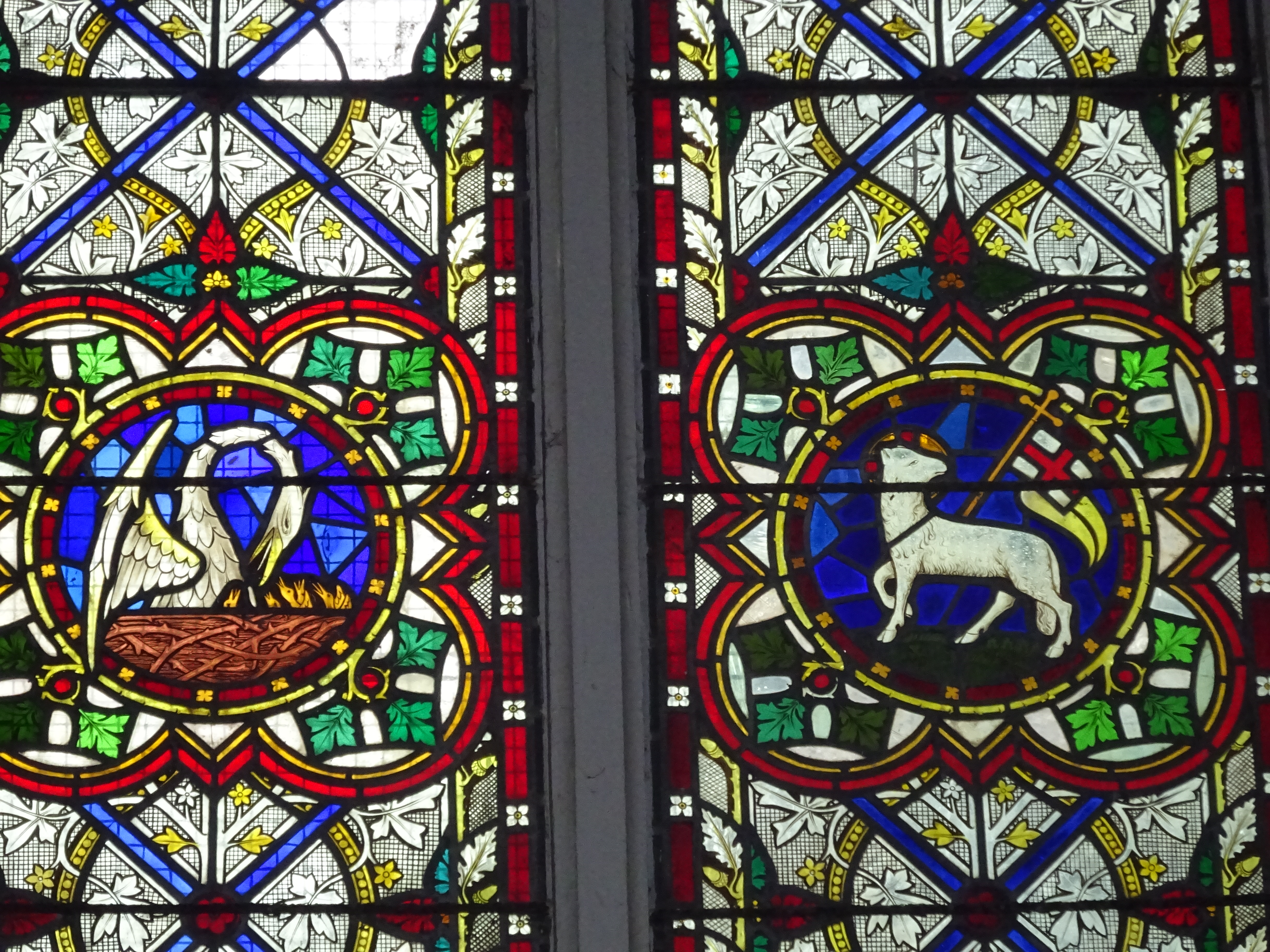
Pelican vulning and Lamb of God with flag with Triumphal cross, both symbols of the Resurrection (stained glass, Ireland, 19th century)

== Music ==
- Marc-Antoine Charpentier:
  - Messe pour le samedi de Pâques, for soloists, chorus and continuo, H.8 (1690).
  - Prose pour le jour de Pâques, for 3 voices and continuo, H.13 (1670)
  - Chant joyeux du temps de Pâques, for soloists, chorus, 2 treble viols, and continuo, H.339 (1685).
  - O filii à 3 voix pareilles, for 3 voices, 2 flutes, and continuo, H.312 (1670).
  - Pour Pâques, for 2 voices, 2 flutes, and continuo, H.308 (1670).
  - O filii pour les voix, violons, flûtes et orgue, for soloists, chorus, flutes, strings, and continuo, H.356 (1685 ?).
- Louis-Nicolas Clérambault: Motet pour le Saint jour de Pâques, in F major, opus 73
- André Campra: Au Christ triomphant, cantata for Easter
- Dieterich Buxtehude: Cantatas BuxWV 15 and BuxWV 62
- Carl Heinrich Graun: Easter Oratorio
- Henrich Biber: Missa Christi resurgentis C.3 (1674)
- Michael Praetorius: Easter Mass
- Johann Sebastian Bach: Christ lag in Todesbanden, BWV 4; Der Himmel lacht! Die Erde jubilieret, BWV 31; Oster-Oratorium, BWV 249.
- Georg Philipp Telemann, more than 100 cantatas for Eastertide.
- Jacques-Nicolas Lemmens: Sonata n° 2 "O Filii", Sonata n° 3 "Pascale", for organ.
- Charles Gounod: Messe solennelle de Pâques (1883).
- Nikolai Rimsky-Korsakov: La Grande Pâque russe, symphonic overture (1888).
- Sergueï Vassilievitch Rachmaninov: Suite pour deux pianos n°1 – Pâques, op. 5, n° 4 (1893).

== See also ==
- Ascension of Jesus in Christian art
- Transfiguration of Jesus in Christian art
- Depictions of Jesus
- Last Supper in Christian art

== Bibliography ==
- Haney, Kristine Edmondson, The Winchester Psalter; an iconographic study, 1986, Leicester University Press, ISBN 0-7185-1260-X.
- Emile Mâle, The Gothic Image: Religious Art in France of the Thirteenth Century, English translation of 3rd ed, 1913, Collins, London (and many other editions), ISBN 978-0064300322
- Young, Brian. The Villein's Bible; Stories in Romanesque Carving, 1990, Barrie & Jenkins, ISBN 0-7126-3888-1
