= The Assassination of Saint Peter Martyr (Titian) =

1528–1529 painting by Titian

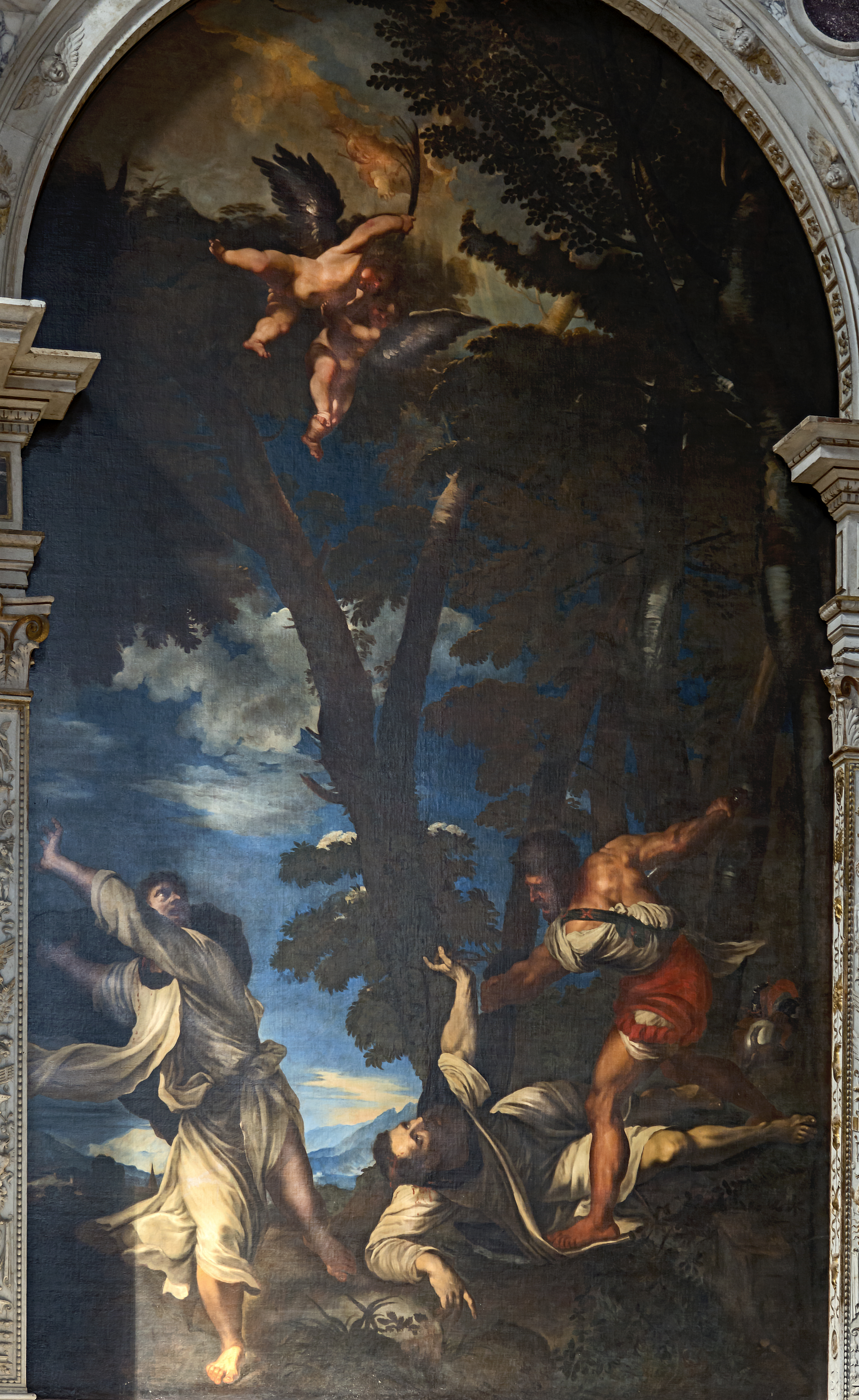
1691 copy by Johann Carl Loth, now in the original position.

The Assassination of Saint Peter Martyr was a 1528-1529 altarpiece in oils by Titian, originally painted on panel and later transferred to canvas. It was "destroyed by an Austrian shell", or the resulting fire at Santi Giovanni e Paolo, Venice in 1867, though a 1691 copy by Johann Carl Loth hangs in its place. It was reproduced as a print under Titian's supervision, and was highly influential. It was 500 x 306 cm, one of Titian's pioneering large vertical altarpieces.

According to Charles Hope, "Only copies and engravings of this proto-Baroque picture remain. It combined extreme violence and a landscape, mostly consisting of a great tree, that pressed into the scene and seems to accentuate the drama in a way that looks forward to the Baroque".

== History ==
=== Commission and reception ===
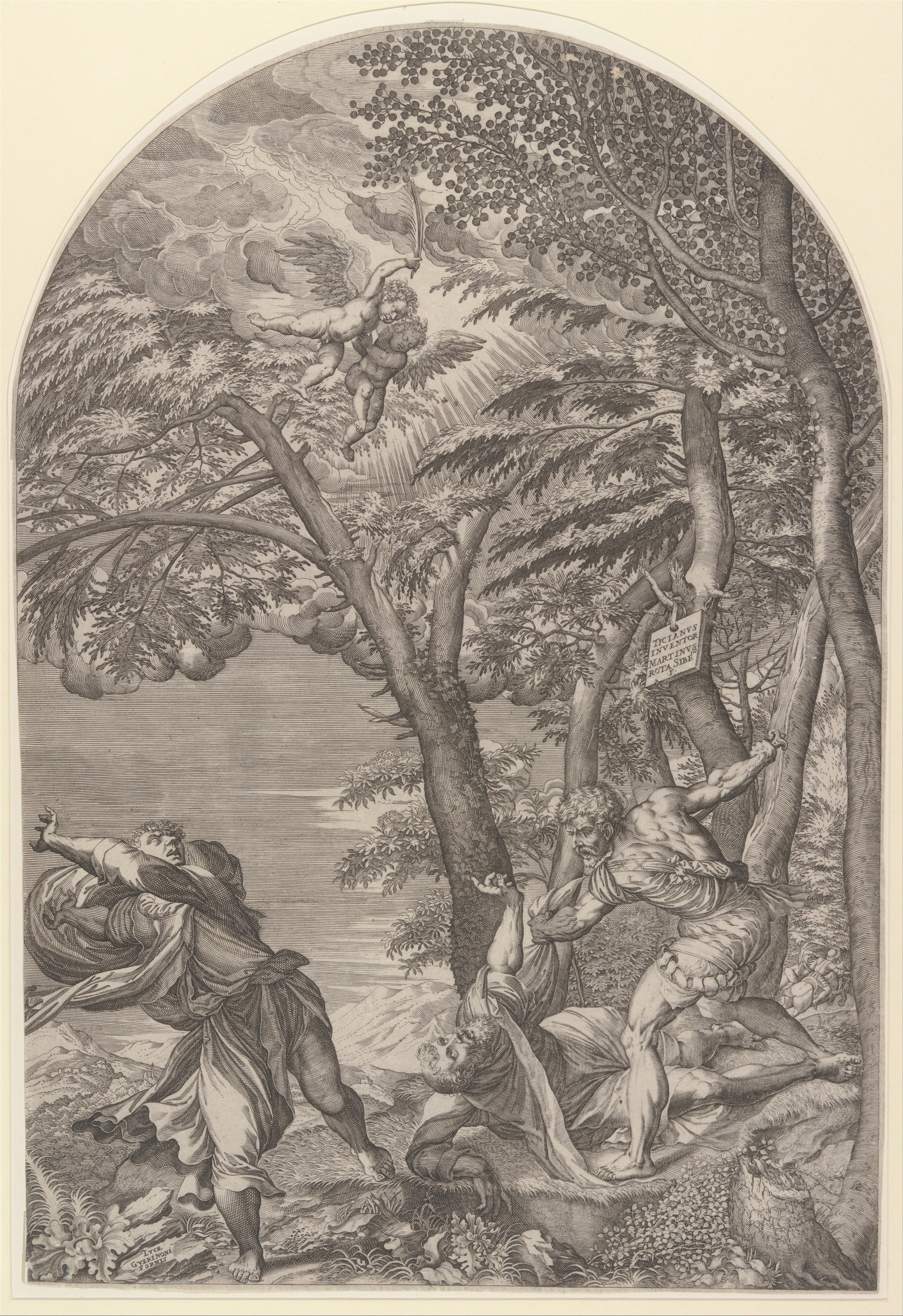
Engraving by Martino Rota, c. 1560. Sheet 15 13/16 x 10 11/16 in. (40.1 x 27.2 cm)

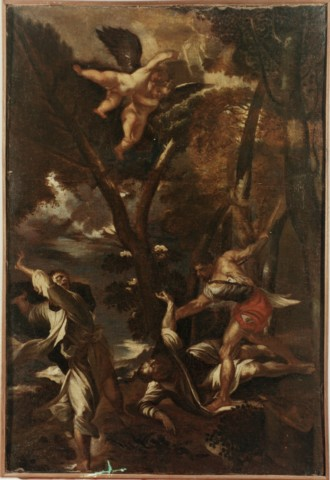
Early copy in Palermo

In 1528 Titian took part in a competition with Il Pordenone and Palma il Vecchio for the commission for a large altarpiece showing the martyrdom of Saint Peter Martyr for the altar of that saint's confraternity in San Zanipolo, the main Dominican centre in Venice. Titian won the commission, in part since the Dominicans did not want to be outdone by the Franciscans, who already had Titian's Assumption and Pesaro Altarpiece, both at the basilica dei Frari. The new work was delivered on 27 April 1530.

The 17th century biographer Carlo Ridolfi described how the artist would specifically return to Cadore to study the effect "of distance on the mountain peaks where, the white and vermillion aurora disappearing, the sun began to rise little by little, streaking the blue sky with gilded strokes, having removed that view of the Cenedese mountains which he could see from his own home". Pietro Aretino's letter to the young sculptor Niccolò Tribolo records Tribolo and Benvenuto Cellini's reaction to the painting on a trip to Venice.

Vasari's Lives of the Artists states of it "[the work] is more complete, more celebrated and more great than any other [work] Titian produced in his whole life, the one showing the best understanding and technique". The work was a major influence on later artists, such as the figure of Saint Matthew in Caravaggio's The Martyrdom of Saint Matthew and the red-cloaked Roman soldier on the left of Annibale Carracci's Resurrection, which are based on Titian's figures of Peter and the fleeing brother respectively.

=== Destruction ===
Early in the 17th century the Dutch merchant Daniel Nys tried in vain to buy the work, even after offering 18,000 ducats. In 1797, after the French occupiers suppressed the monastery, the work was taken to France, where it was transferred from panel to canvas, then a common procedure there. It was returned to Venice in 1816 as part of the restitution project personally headed by Antonio Canova. There it was placed in the Madonna del Rosario chapel rather than on its original altar. A fire completely destroyed the chapel and the painting on 16 August 1867. Giovanni Battista Cavalcaselle wrote "no other work more victoriously demonstrated the extraordinary power of that mind - this loss is irreparable for art.".

One of the last people to see the work before the fire was Gaetano Milanesi:

of this painting, one can repeat what has been said about [the same artist's] Assumption - that it is one of the most beautiful [paintings] in the world

Along with copies of varying sizes, media and quality and a pen study (15,7x28,9 cm) in the Wicar Museum in Lille, two blurry black and white photographs survive of two fragments saved from the fire and taken to Switzerland for restoration, though the fragments themselves are lost.

== See also ==
- List of works by Titian

== Bibliography ==
- Jaffé, David (ed.), Titian, The National Gallery Company/Yale, London, 2003, ISBN 1-85709-903-6
- (in Italian) Francesco Valcanover, L'opera completa di Tiziano, Rizzoli, Milano 1969.
- (in Italian) Stefano Zuffi, Tiziano, Mondadori Arte, Milano 2008. ISBN 978-88-370-6436-5
