= Lamentation over the Dead Christ (Signorelli) =

Painting by Luca Signorelli

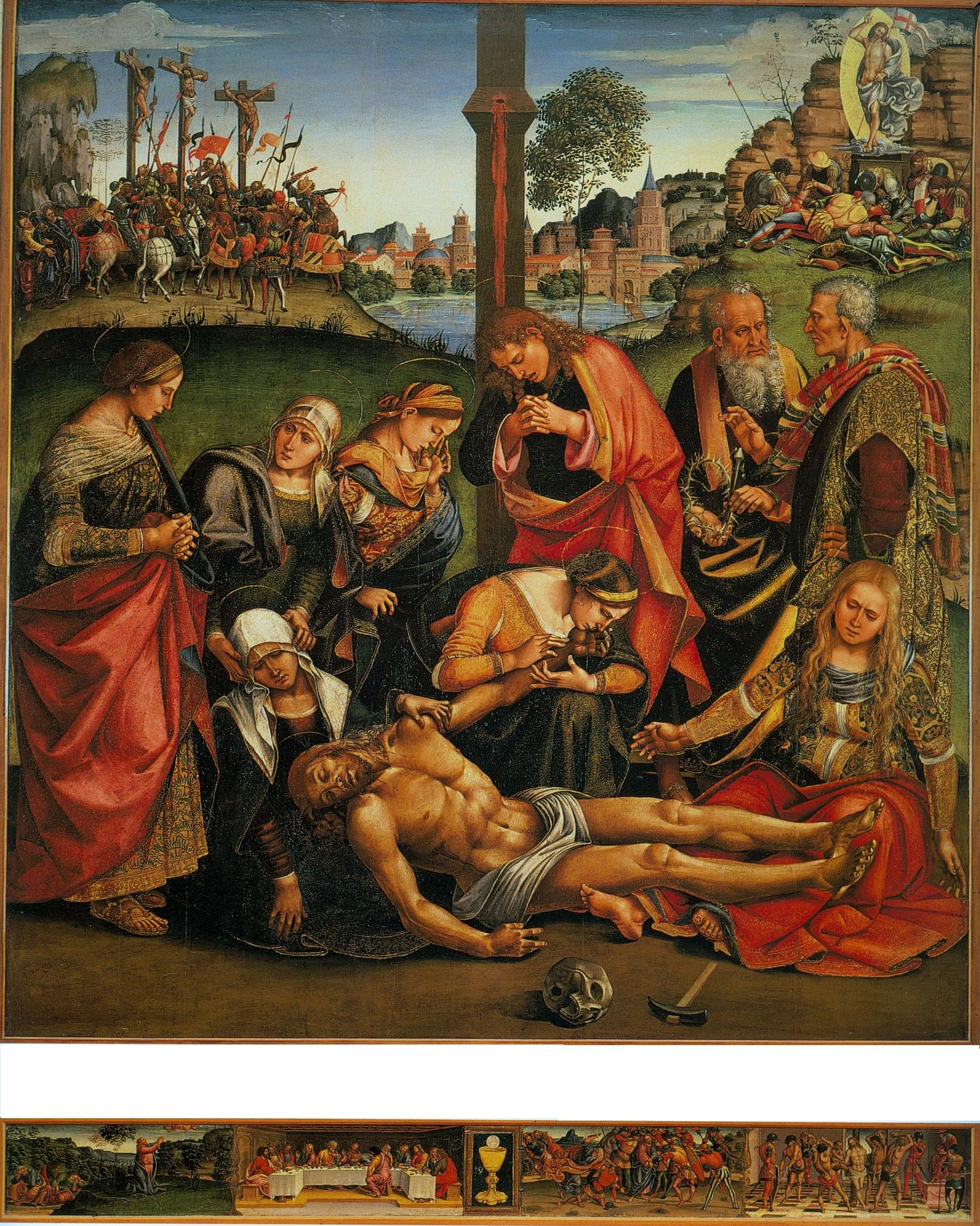
Main work and predella

Lamentation over the Dead Christ is a painting of 1502 in oils on panel by Luca Signorelli, painted for the church of Santa Margherita and now in the Diocesan Museum in Cortona. In the left background is the Crucifixion and in the right background the Resurrection.

According to the 1568 edition of Vasari's Lives of the Artists, in the summer of 1502 Signorelli received news of his son Antonio's death from the plague in Cortona. Signorelli went from Orvieto to see the body, had it uncovered and, in Vasari's words, "with the greatest presence of mind, without weeping or tears, he drew him, always wanting to see – through the work of his hands – what nature had given him and his enemy fortune had taken away". He used the drawing for Lamentation. Its style is similar to that of the artist's Chapel of San Brizio frescoes, which he had almost finished at that time. He added an autograph copy of the work to the fresco on his return to Orvieto at the end of 1502.

== Predella ==
Quicker in style and probably by the master's students but based on drawings by him, the predella shows four more scenes from Christ's Passion: Gethsemane, Last Supper, Arrest and Flagellation.

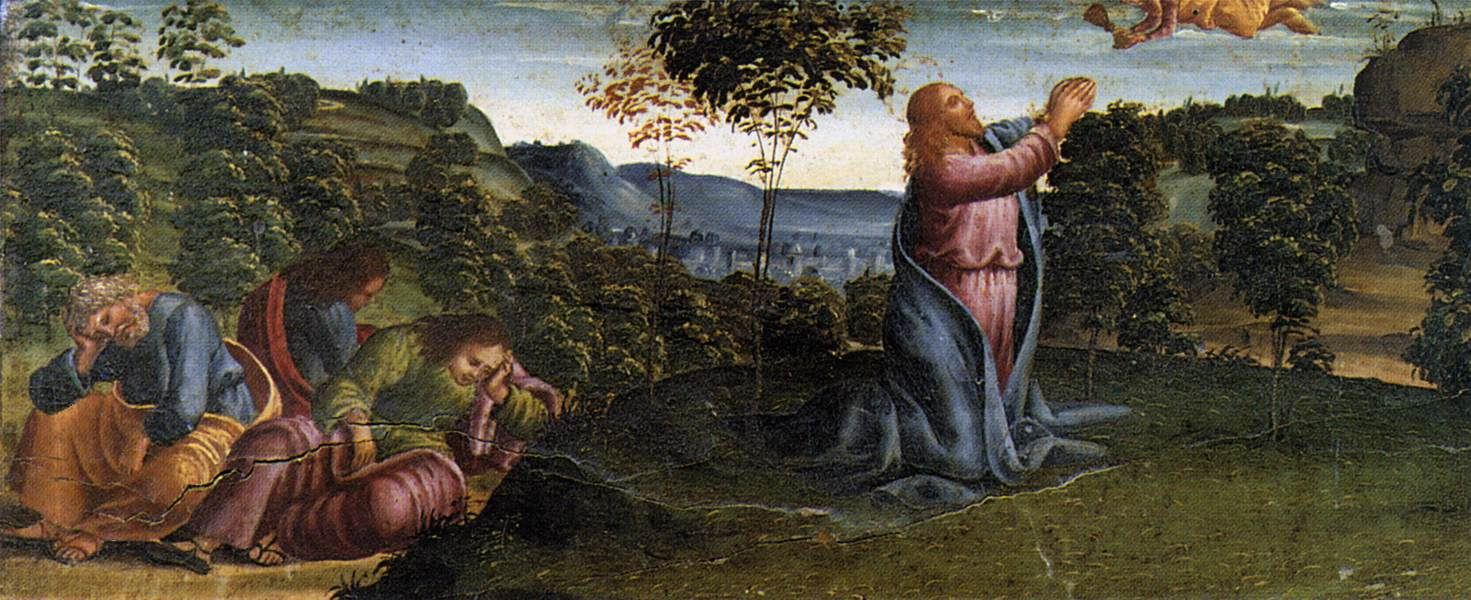
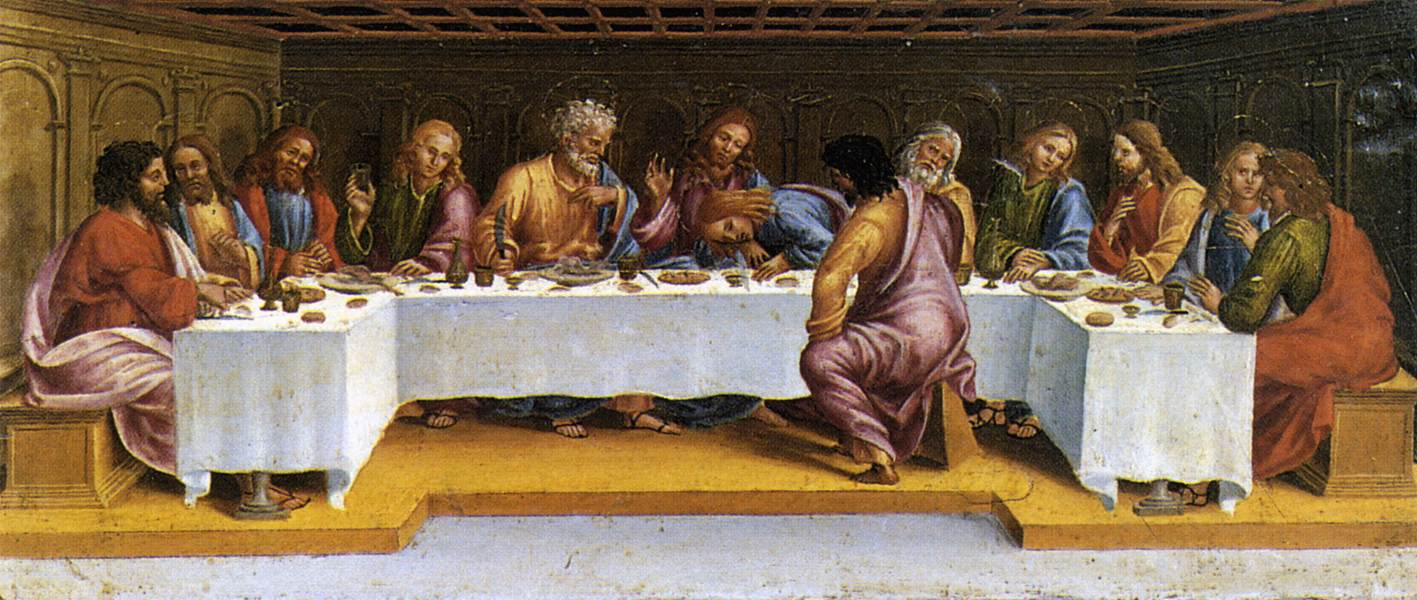
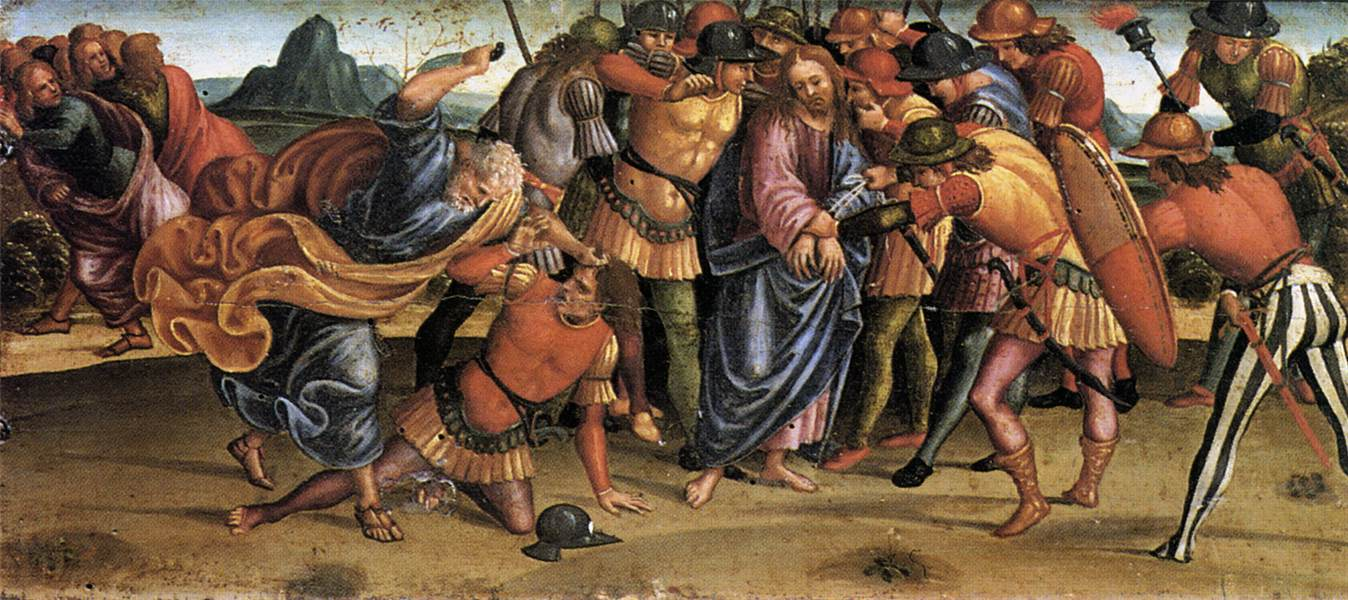
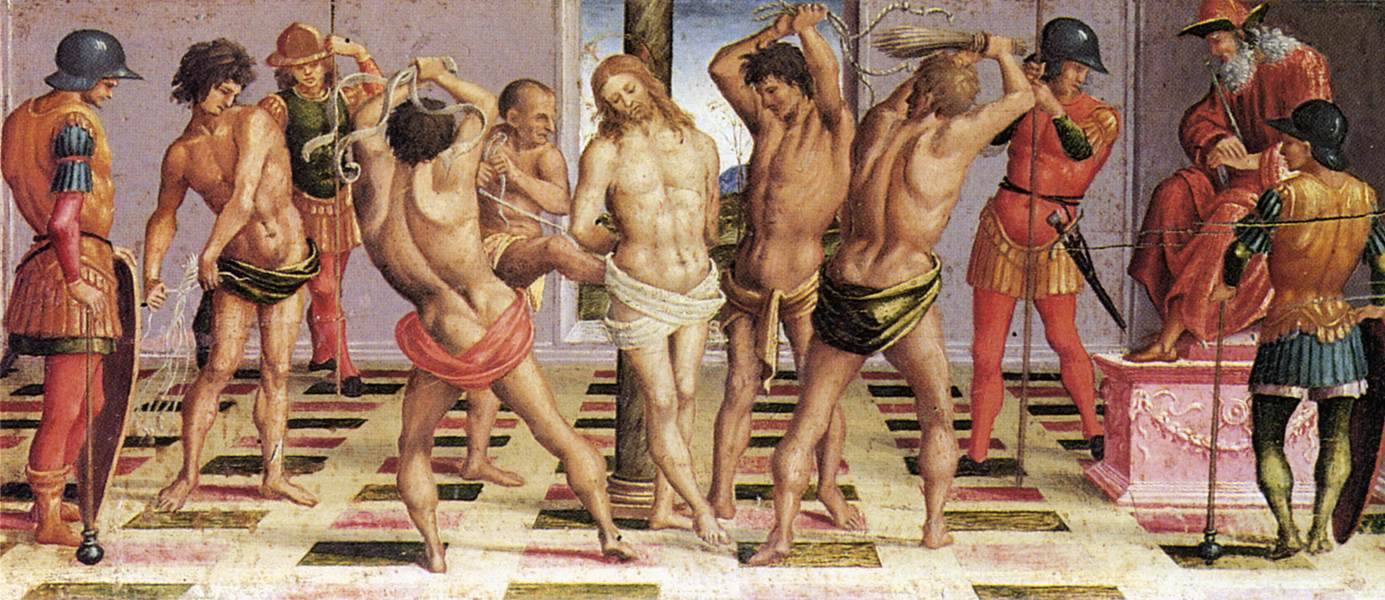
Predella to Lamentation
