= Resurrection of Christ (Raphael) =

Painting by Raphael

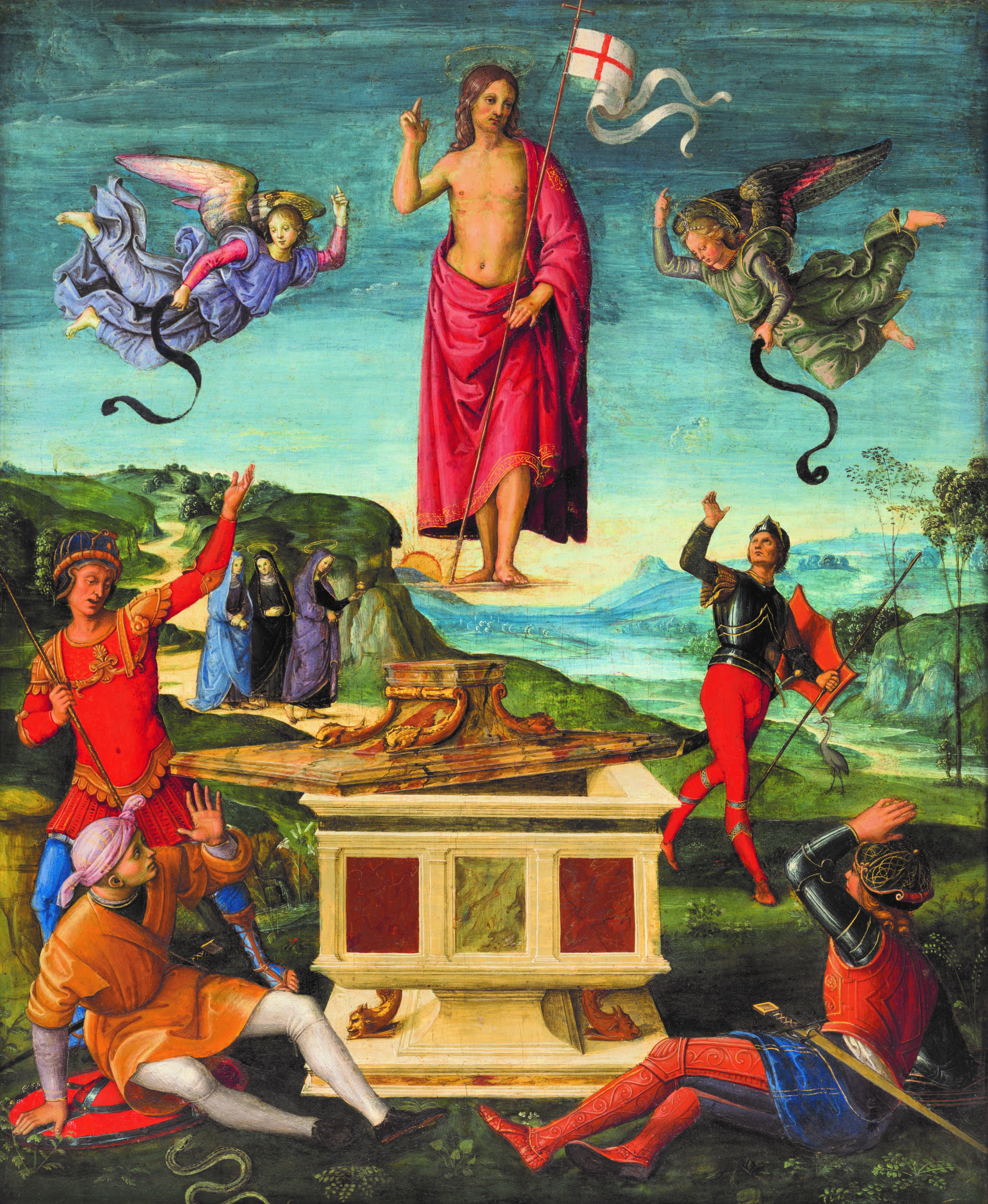
- Artist: Raphael
- Year: 1499–1502
- Medium: oil on wood
- Movement: High Renaissance
- Dimensions: 52 cm × 44 cm (20 in × 17 in)
- Location: São Paulo Museum of Art, Brazil

The Resurrection of Christ (1499–1502), also called The Kinnaird Resurrection (after a family who formerly owned the painting, the Lords Kinnaird), is an oil painting on wood by the Italian High Renaissance master Raphael. The work is one of the earliest known paintings by the artist, executed between 1499 and 1502. It is probably a piece of an unknown predella, though it has been suggested that the painting could be one of the remaining works of the Baronci Altarpiece, Raphael's first recorded commission (seriously damaged by an earthquake in 1789, fragments of which are today found in museums across Europe). The painting is now in the São Paulo Museum of Art.

The Kinnaird Resurrection is one of the first preserved works of Raphael in which his natural dramatic style of composition was already obvious, as opposed to the gentle poetic style of his master, Pietro Perugino. The extremely rational composition is ruled by a complex ideal geometry which interlinks all the elements of the scene and gives it a strange animated rhythm, transforming the characters in the painting into co-protagonists in a unique "choreography". The painting possesses an esthetic influence from Pinturicchio and Melozzo da Forlì, though the spatial orchestration of the work, with its tendency to movement, shows Raphael's knowledge of the Florentine artistic milieu of the 16th century.

The painting was first identified by Wilhelm Bode in 1880 at Rossie Priory the home of Arthur Kinnaird, 10th Lord Kinnaird. It was sold by the 12th Lord Kinnaird in 1946 at Christie's for a mere 600 guineas.

The work was acquired by the São Paulo Museum of Art in 1954. Pietro Maria Bardi, former director of the museum, on the recommendation of Mario Modestini, his associate at the Studio D'Arte Palma in Rome, took the responsibility of adding the Kinnaird Resurrection to the body of works of Raphael, based on the existence of two preparatory studies for the composition, starting a heated debate about its authorship. Nowadays, the reference to Raphael is almost unanimously accepted by experts. It is the only work by that artist currently in the Southern Hemisphere.

== See also ==
- List of paintings by Raphael

== Sources ==
- Barone, Juliana; Luiz Marquez (1998). "Raffaello Sanzio". In Luiz Marquez (ed.). Catálogo do Museu de Arte de São Paulo Assis Chateaubriand. São Paulo: Prêmio. pp. 62–67.
- Longhi, Roberto (1955). "Percorso di Raffaello giovine". Paragone (65). Florence: 8–23.
