= Resurrection of Christ (Bellini) =

Painting by Giovanni Bellini

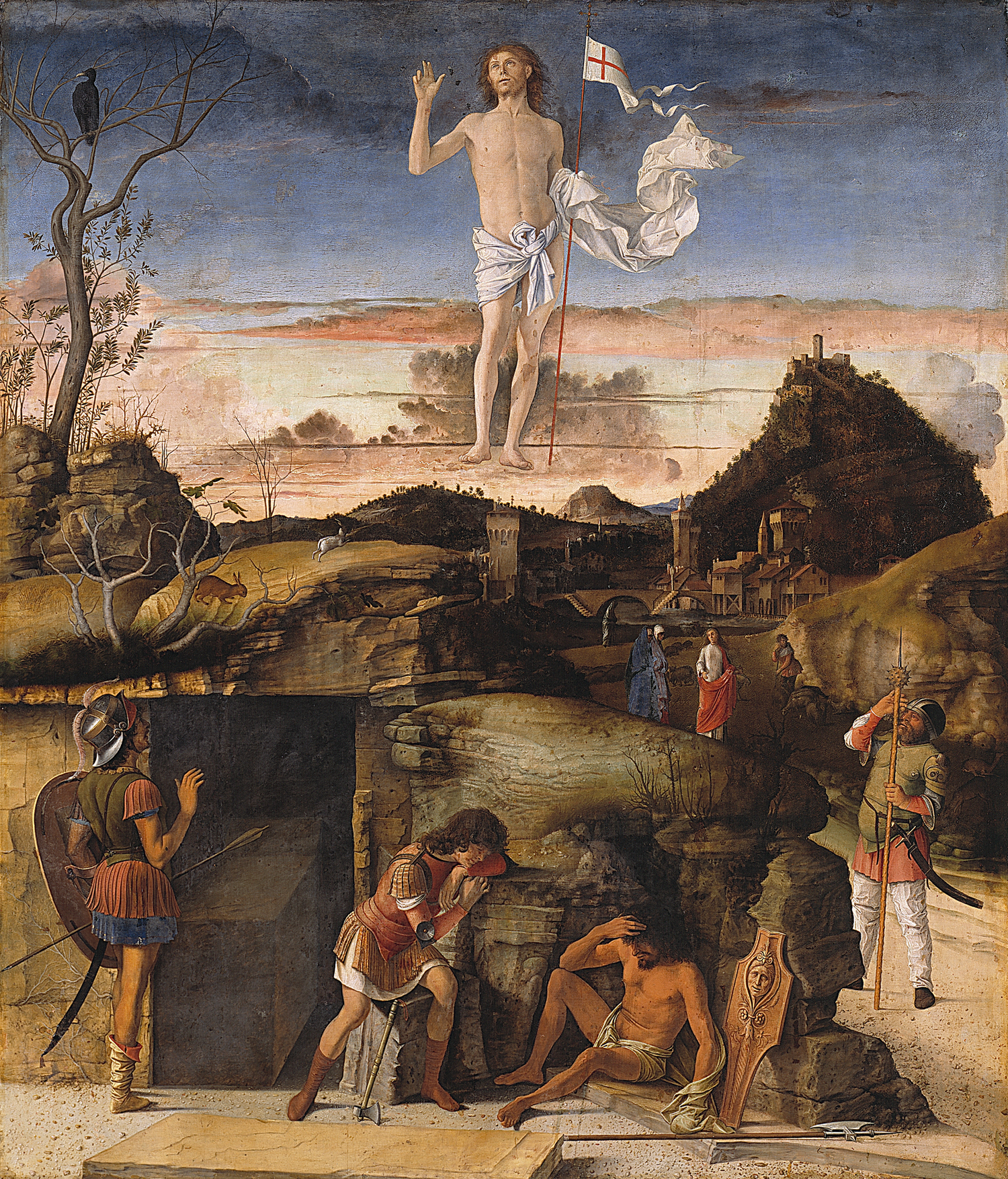
- Artist: Giovanni Bellini
- Year: 1475–1479
- Medium: oil on panel, transferred to canvas
- Dimensions: 148 cm × 128 cm (58 in × 50 in)
- Location: Gemäldegalerie, Berlin

Resurrection of Christ is a painting by the Italian Renaissance artist Giovanni Bellini. The painting is estimated to be created sometime between 1475 and 1479. The painting was created on poplar wood, then transferred to canvas. The Resurrection of Christ's dimensions are in total 148 x 128 cm (which is 58 in x 50 in).

== Artist ==
Giovanni Bellini was born in the mid to late 1420s in Venice, Italy to Nicolo Bellini and Anna Bellini. Nicolo was the half brother of Jacopo Bellini, another influential Renaissance Italian artist. When Nicolo Bellini died, Giovanni Bellini was raised by Jacopo Bellini, who greatly influenced his artistic development. Jacopo's artistic influence on Giovanni influenced the painting, Resurrection of Christ.

== History ==
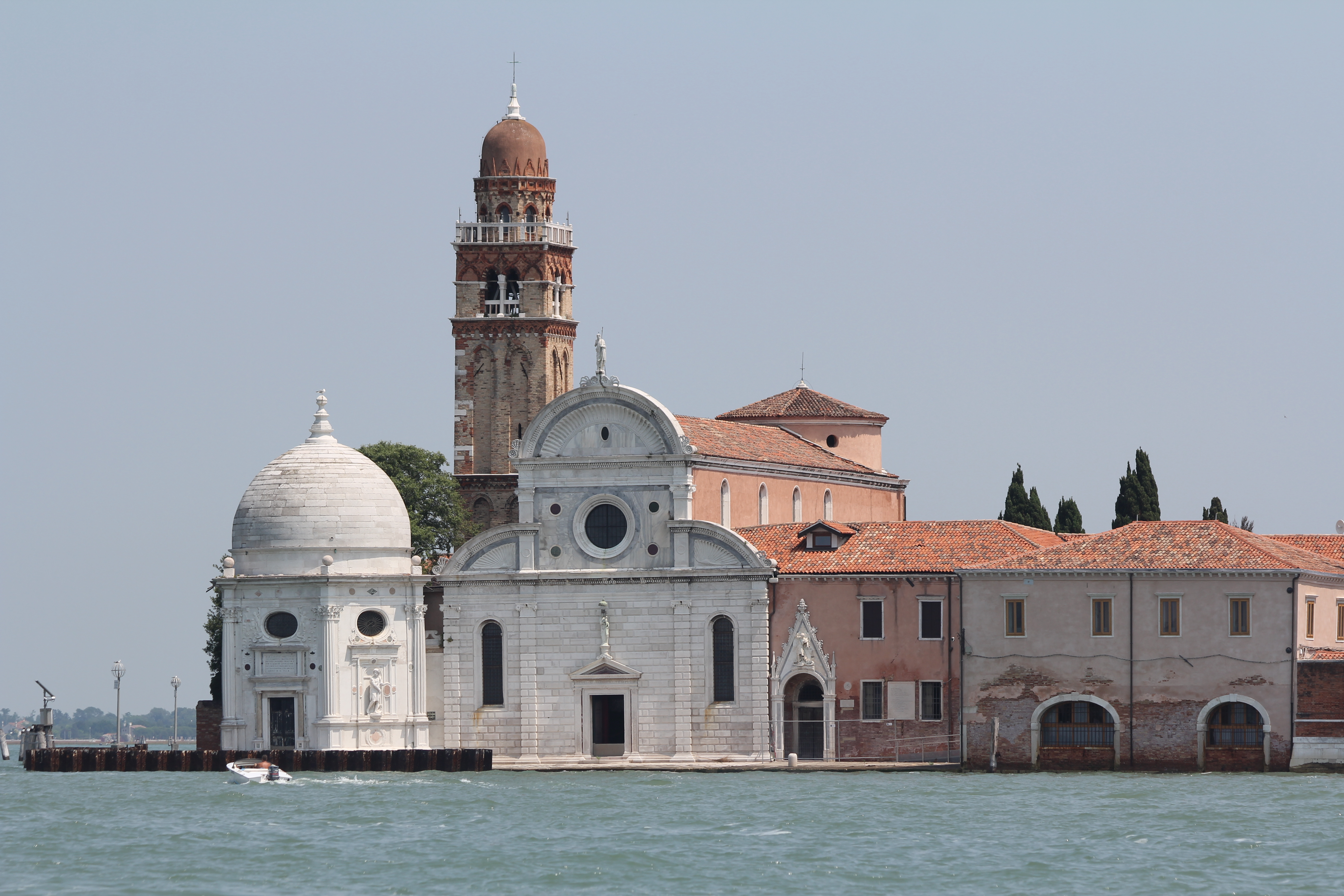
San Michele di Murano

The Resurrection of Christ was produced for the Marino Zorzi chapel in the mortuary church of San Michele di Murano in Venice. The Berlin State Museums state that this painting fit the theme of the location of the painting, as its patrons hoped to be reborn to life when the Last Judgment would arrive. It has previously been attributed to Cima da Conegliano, Previtali, Bartolomeo Veneto and Marco Basaiti, but the work was finally attributed to Bellini by Francesco Sansovino in 1581.

== Subject ==
The work Resurrection of Christ shows a historical significant moment, different from other Renaissance paintings at the time, and demonstrates a resurrected Christ who is hovering over the soldiers that Pilate assigned to guard. In addition to the soldiers, there is an undressed man, and other non-soldier spectators nearby, including a holy women and a shepherd. Rutherglen's analysis states Bellini includes a rising sun in the background of this painting to demonstrate a specific time of day. This aligns with religious Gospels that state Christ rose during an Easter morning during early dawn. The landscape includes a dark blue in the atmosphere as it transitions to grey and peach. However, Rutherglen notes in her analysis that some scholars, unnamed, have critiqued the use of the landscape, stating a "lack of compositional unity and symbolic heft."

According to the Bible, after Resurrection, Christ ate broiled fish and told his followers to verify his resurrection by seeing Christ and touching Christ. However, Christ also "vanished from their sight" and told Mary Magdalen to not touch him, which may be seen as "conflicting reports" and Bellini also incorporates this into his work. In Bellini's work, Christ is depicted to float in the air, but also may be seen as being upheld by the tower in the landscape below him; in this way, Bellini also captured both sides of the conflicting reports as shown in the Bible. Giulio Cantalamessa noted how Bellini showed this in his work, stating it looks like Christ is defying gravity, however, Christ's legs also appear to be supported firmly, as if there was an imaginary pedestal underneath him.

The Renaissance of Christ was acquired by the Gemäldegalerie, Berlin in 1903 and a full restoration shortly afterwards confirmed its attribution to Bellini. However, the trouble that the scriptural lacuna faced was that the Resurrection has developed into the Christian art theme, much later than the incarnation episodes which included Baptism and Nativity.

== Analysis ==
The work of the Resurrection of Christ is stated to be influenced by another Italian Renaissance artist, Antonello de Messina. The Resurrection of Christ is influenced from de Messina through the use of oils in this work. The Resurrection of Christ is stated to be the earliest of Bellini's work from this influence. This work, along with other Bellini works, have not been documented in a business transaction between 1470 and 1513, while some of Bellini's later works include a date inscribed directly on the paintings, which also contributes to the broad range of dates this painting could be from.

Bellini did not have an abundance of source content when creating the Resurrection of Christ. In the Gospels, the resurrection of Jesus is not thoroughly described, but is stated that one of more holy women visited the sepulcher on Easter Sunday after Jesus's crucifixion and the holy women noted Jesus was not there and he has risen. Carlo Ridolfi noted that Bellini also symbolizes the discovery of the resurrection because Bellini includes the Maries that are approaching the cave through the countryside that is featured in the background. The countryside village that is depicted has been described before as a view of Monselice, near Padua. However, although Bellini painted realistic components and landscape, the Berlin State Museums broadly notes some scholars state this is showing no specific location at all, although it is not noted which scholars have stated this.

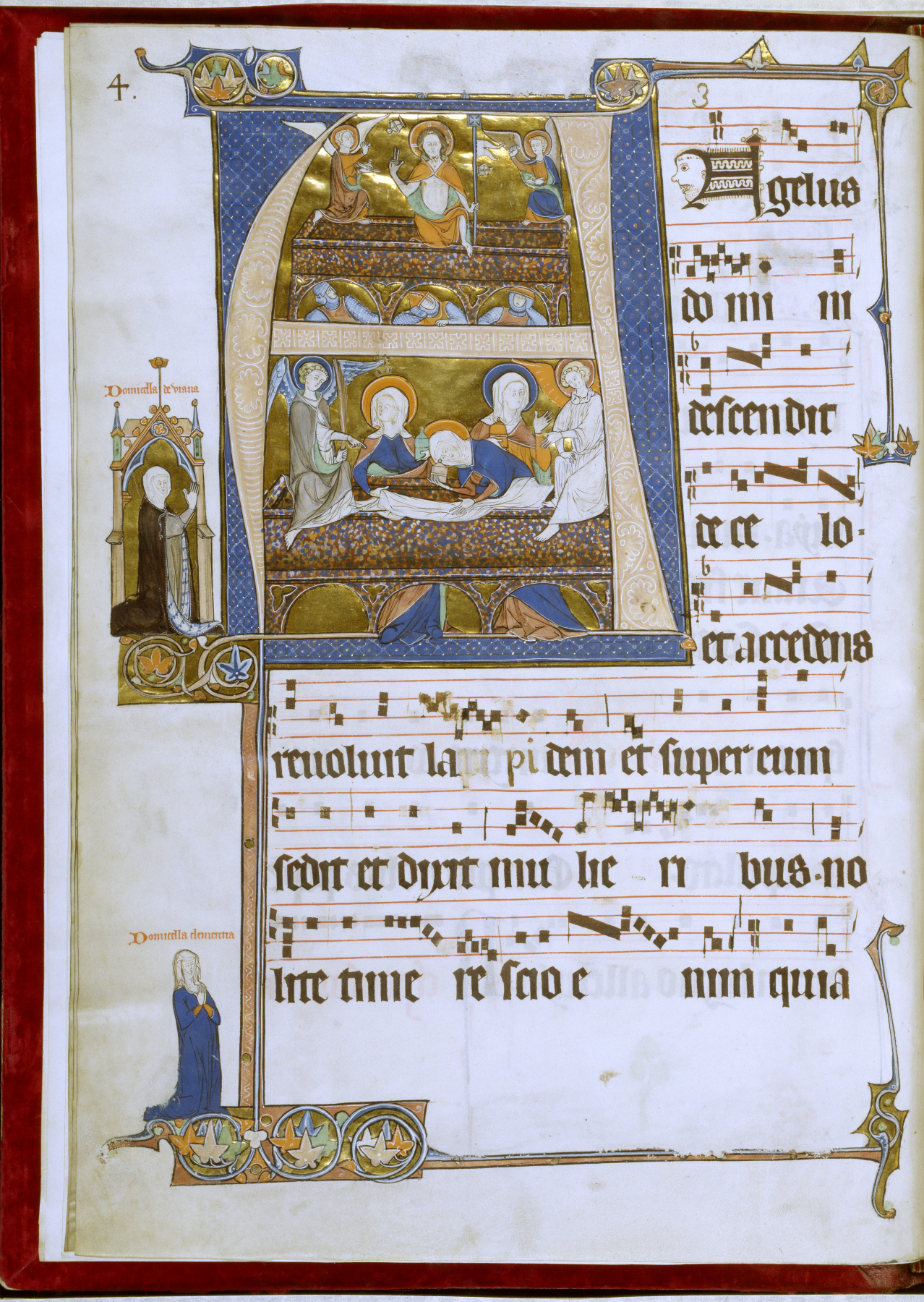
Beaupré Antiphonary, vol. I, fol. 3V, detail, 1290, tempera and gold on parchment, 47.5 x 33.5 cm, Baltimore, Walters Art Museum. Photo: Walters Art Museum

Bellini's the Resurrection of Christ would end up becoming symbolic theme and depiction in Christian art of what the resurrection of Christ may have looked like. Earlier depictions of Christ's resurrection include in the ninth-century Byzantine psalters showing Jesus climbing out of a tomb, with one foot on the edge, while making a gesture with one hand and holding a staff in the other. Previous works describe more of a literal view of a resurrection. Bellini's work, on the other hand, depicts Christ as floating above soldiers, holy women, and shepherds when resurrected. This type of depiction, of a human figure rising above in a miraculous and rising way, is popular in Tuscany.

Between the 1450s to 1460s, Bellini trained under Andrea Mantegna and for many years, remained loyal to his mentor. Bellini wanted to paint like Mentegna did, in a mineral-looking way. Until later, in the 1470s, Bellini allowed himself more artistic expression and flexibility in his paintings. In the Resurrection, Bellini still pays homage to Mantegna by quoting Mantegna in the cormorant on the tree in the top left of the painting and again in the soldier's shield on the right of the painting.

Additionally, the use of light is a central discussion piece in Bellini's work. Bellini features some clouds pink, and some clouds still dark, while Christ himself remains in light, which could be referenced to being touched by the light of God. As some areas are touched by light, and some are not, Christ himself appears to be able to directly look into the light without pain or being blinded.

== See also ==
- List of works by Giovanni Bellini
