= Resurrection of Christ (Bermejo) =

Painting by Bartolomé Bermejo

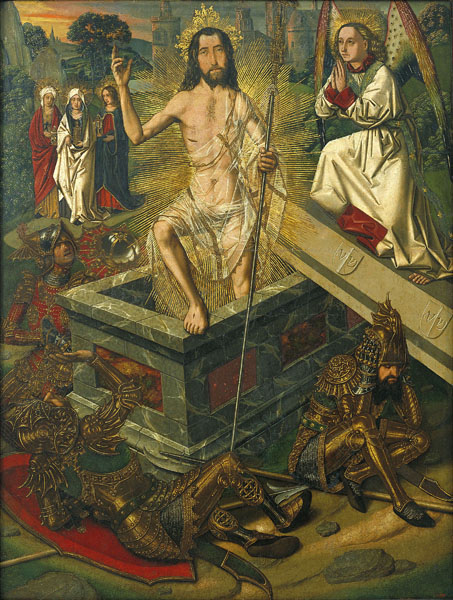
- Artist: Bartolomé Bermejo
- Year: Circa 1475
- Type: Oil and gilding on wood
- Dimensions: 90 cm × 69 cm (35 in × 27 in)
- Location: Museu Nacional d'Art de Catalunya; Barcelona

Resurrection is a painting by Bartolomé Bermejo conserved at the National Art Museum of Catalonia.

== Description ==
The Resurrection is one of the four surviving compartments of an altarpiece devoted to Christ, the work of Bartolomé Bermejo, a painter from Córdoba whose known activity was developed in the Crown of Aragon. Bermejo's work, characterised by its unidealised realism, introduced several novelties from northern European painting, such as the use of oil as a binder instead of egg tempera. In this compartment, Christ emerges from the grave before the look of adoration of an angel, while the soldiers guarding the tomb are terrified by the miracle. In the background can be seen the Three Marys, who have left Jerusalem and are walking towards the grave with jars of perfume to anoint Christ's body
