= The Resurrection of Christ (Rubens, Florence) =

Painting by Peter Paul Rubens

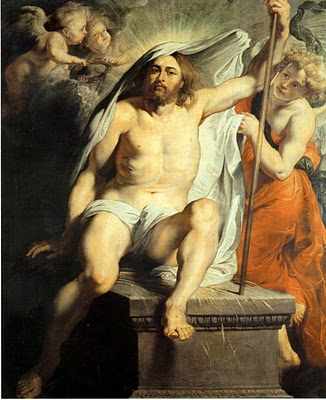
The Resurrection of Christ (c. 1616) by Rubens

The Resurrection of Christ, The Easter Tomb or The Triumph of Christ over Death and Sin is a painting by Peter Paul Rubens, executed c. 1616. It entered the collection of Ferdinando de' Medici, Grand Prince of Tuscany between 1713 and 1723 and is now in the Galleria Palatina of the Palazzo Pitti in Florence.

== Bibliography ==
- Marco Chiarini, Galleria palatina e Appartamenti Reali, Sillabe, Livorno 1998. ISBN 978-88-86392-48-8
