= Resurrection (Annibale Carracci) =

Painting by Annibale Carracci

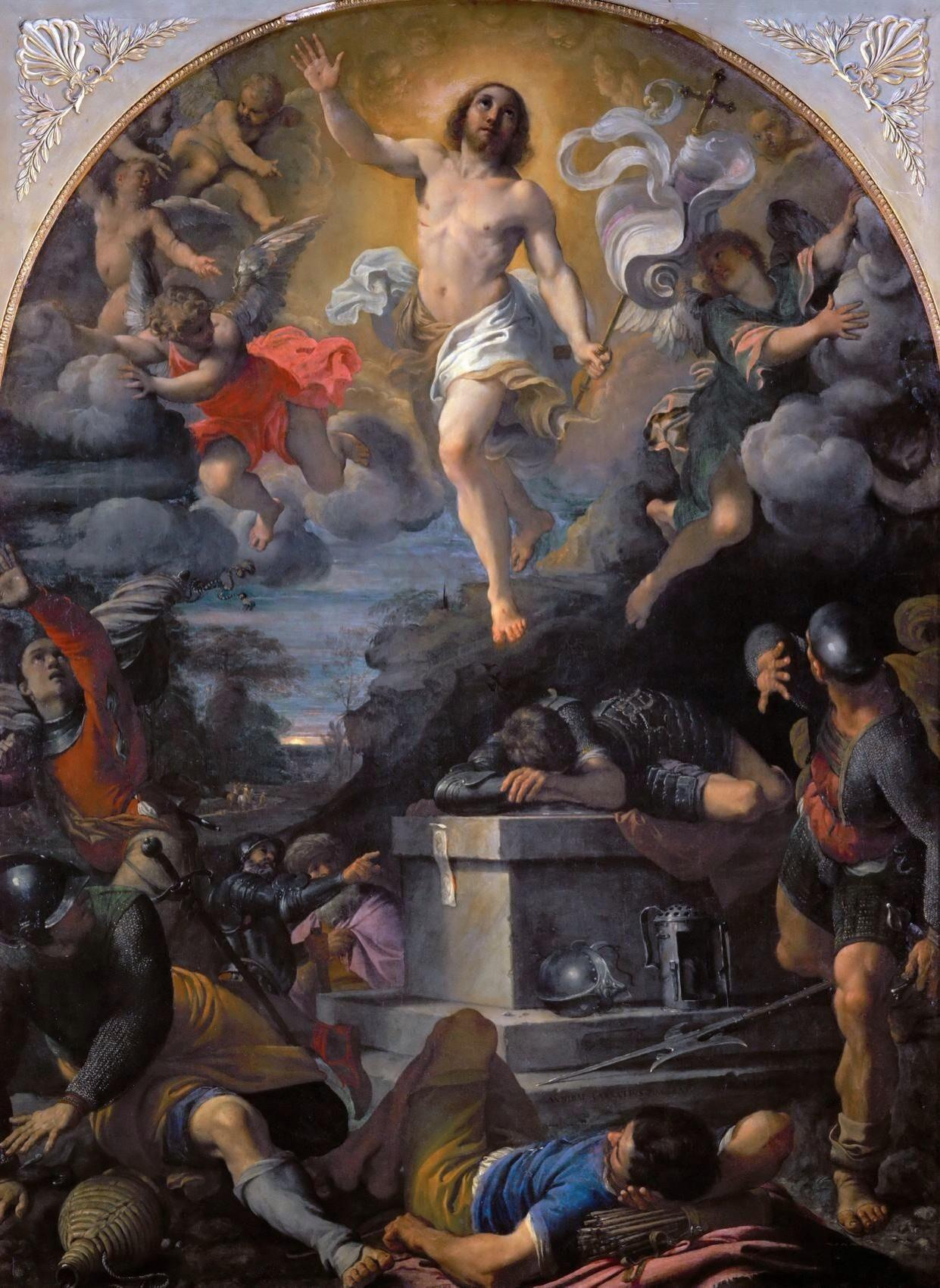
Resurrection (1593) by Annibale Carracci

Resurrection is a 1593 oil on canvas painting by the Italian Baroque artist Annibale Carracci, now in the Louvre in Paris, whose Cabinet des Dessins also houses a preparatory study for the work. It is also known as the Angelelli Resurrection after the Bolognese family which long owned it. It is signed and dated ANNIBAL CARRATIUS PINGEBAT. MDXCIII.

It was originally produced for the private chapel in the Palazzo Luchini in Bologna, a palace later ceded to the Angelelli family along with the painting, though they later gave the latter to the Corpus Domini monastery in Bologna, where it hung in the chapel dedicated to Catherine of Bologna. It had already reached a high price by the end of the 17th century, one of the highest recorded for that period. The work was seized by the French occupiers in 1797 and not returned to Italy after the end of the Napoleonic Wars.

The Resurrection became one of the most celebrated works by Annibale present in Bologna as well as one of the paradigms of the Bolognese school of painting between the sixteenth and seventeenth centuries.

According to Bellori, Annibale's compensation for the execution of the painting was modest, partly paid even with foodstuffs.

== Description and style ==
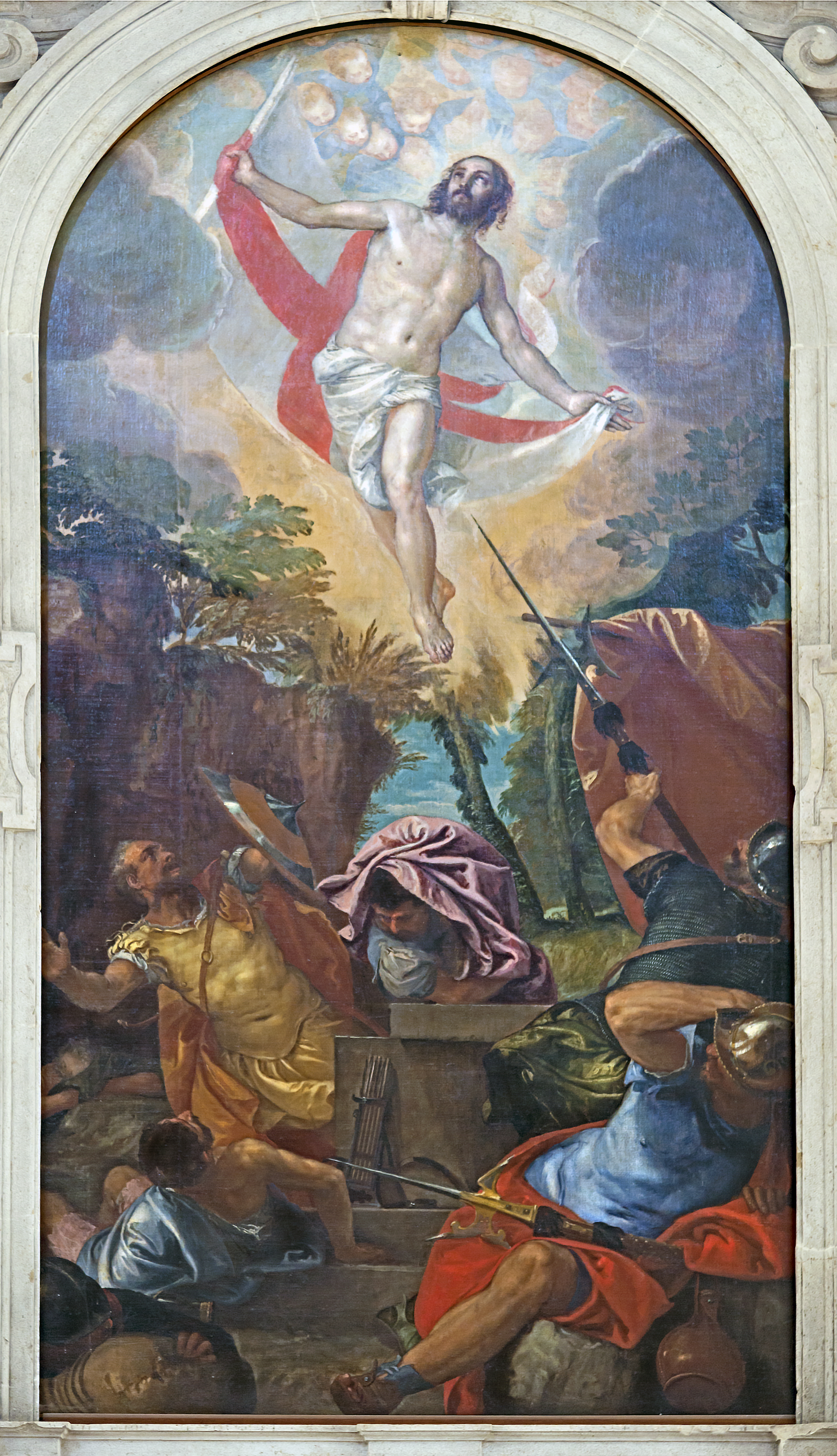
Paolo Veronese, Resurrection (ca. 1560), Chiesa di San Francesco della Vigna, Venice

In the upper part of the canvas, a host of angels surrounds the risen Christ, who holds the banner of the cross in his left hand. A warm, supernatural light radiates from the clouds supporting the angels, contrasting with the misty, twilight atmosphere of the remaining background.

Christ hovers above the tomb, which, underscoring the miracle in progress, is closed and sealed with a still-intact scroll. A soldier, in the background at the center of the composition, points out to a man in a turban the astonishing detail of the intact seal. Another soldier sleeps on the tombstone, placing all his weight on it, further evidence of the miraculous nature of the Lord's Resurrection.

In the lower part of the canvas, other guards react in various ways to the event they are witnessing: some flee in amazement, while another sleeps, still unaware of the miracle. In depicting this group of soldiers, Annibale depicts a variety of poses that convey the excitement and dismay of this supreme moment.

Annibale displays mastery of foreshortening in the plastic rendering of the Roman soldiers themselves. The furnishings – the rolling flask on the left, the bundle of arrows used as a pillow by the sleeper below, a lamp, and the soldiers' weapons – are rendered with extreme care almost as still lifes within the sacred composition.

The Resurrection is the work in which the research conducted by Annibale in the previous years results in the achievement of a harmonious balance between the Correggesque ascendant (to which the figure of Christ and in general the upper part of the painting can be associated) and the Venetian one.

Titian and Veronese are probably models that Annibale had in mind for the execution of the canvas commissioned by the Luchinis. Of the first there is a literal quotation from the lost masterpiece depicting the Martyrdom of St. Peter of Verona (painting known through copies and engravings): the fleeing soldier on the left of Carracci's Resurrection is an evident reprise of the martyr Peter's brother who appeared in Titian's painting.

There are compositional and iconographic analogies between Annibale's canvas and some of the different versions of the Resurrection created by Veronese (sometimes executed with the help of the workshop). This is the case in particular of the Resurrection by Veronese in the Venetian church of San Francesco della Vigna, which, in the lower part, shows similarities with Annibale's painting.

In addition to the sum of his past experiences, the canvas now at the Louvre seems to reveal Annibale's growing attention towards the classical which not long after would emerge more fully with the arrival of Carracci in Rome at the service of the Farnese family.
