= Tassi =

Tassi or Tasso or Tassis is an Italian surname. Notable people with the surname include:

- Agostino Tassi (1578–1644), Italian painter
- Attila Tassi (born 1999), Hungarian racing driver
- Edoardo Tassi (born 1998), Italian football player
- Filomena Tassi, Canadian politician
- Francesco Maria Tassi (1716–1782), Italian art historian
- Lorenzo Tassi (born 1995), Italian footballer
- Madonna Tassi, Canadian singer
- Matteo Tassi (1831–1895), Italian painter
- Maria Aurelia Tasso or Tassis, 18th-century Benedictine nun and writer
- Bernardo Tasso
- Torquato Tasso
- Omodeo Tasso
