= Transfiguration Altarpiece =

Painting by Pietro Perugino

Transfiguration
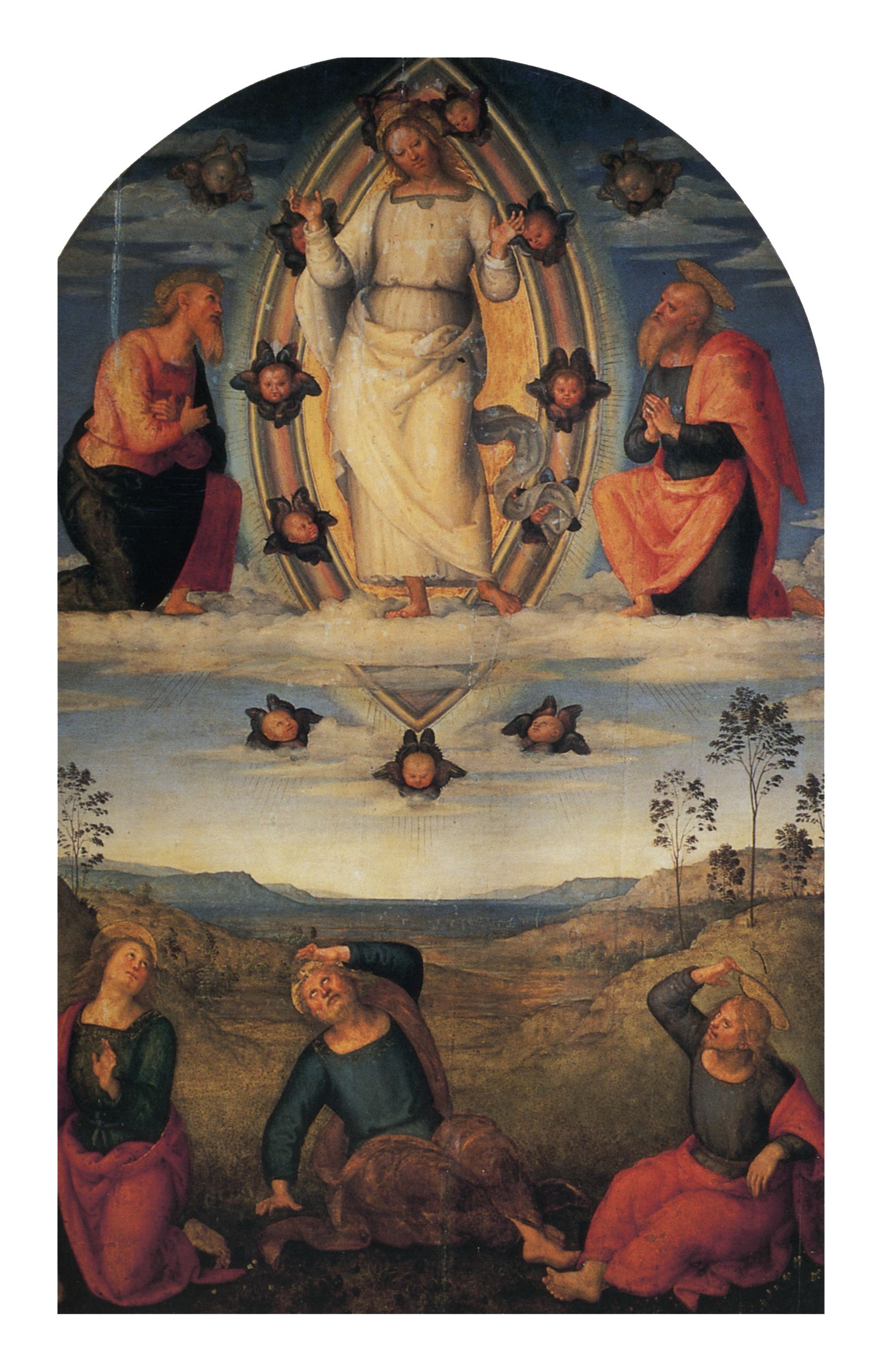
- Artist: Perugino
- Year: 1517
- Medium: oil on panel
- Dimensions: 290 cm × 185 cm (110 in × 73 in)
- Location: Galleria Nazionale dell'Umbria, Perugia

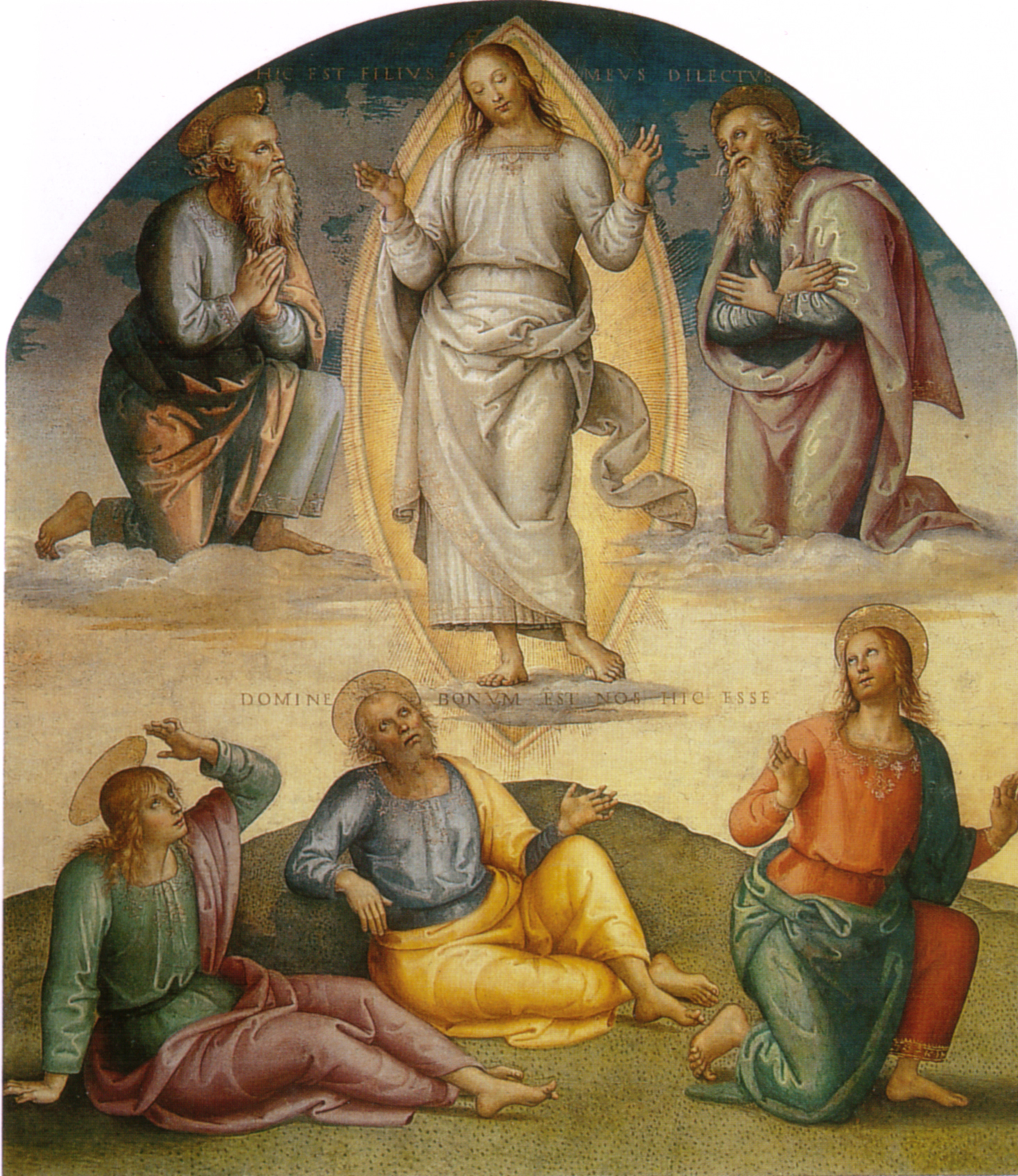
Transfiguration, Collegio del Cambio, Pérouse

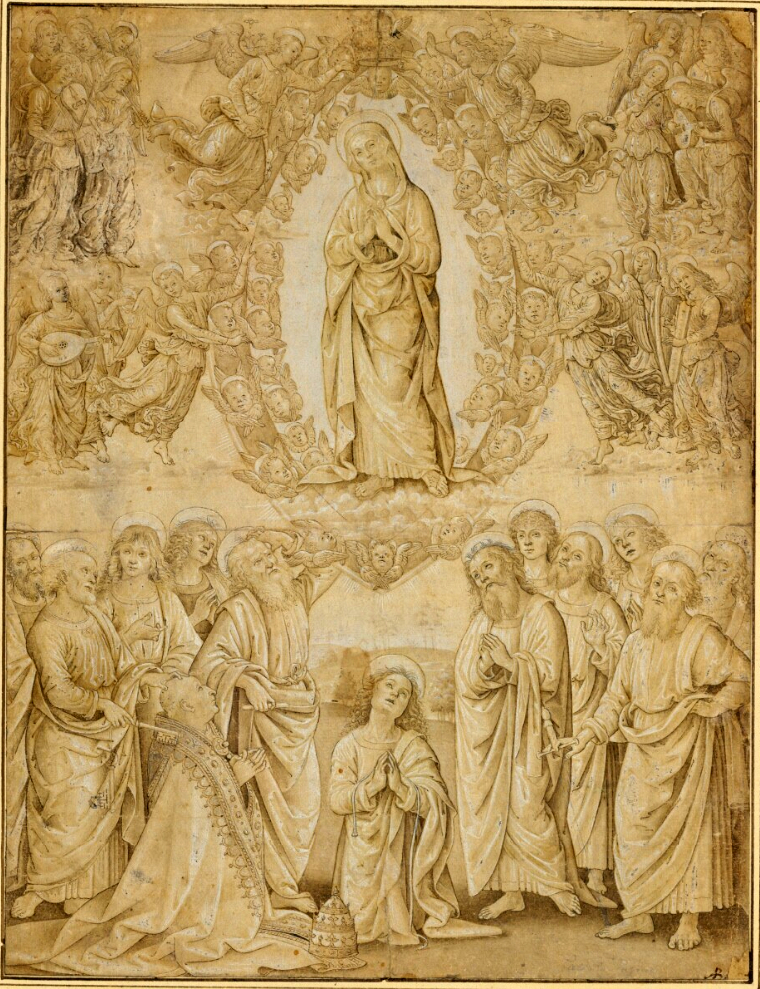
Drawing by Pinturicchio of Perugino's lost Assumption in the Sistine Chapel.

The Transfiguration Altarpiece is an altarpiece of the Transfiguration of Jesus by Perugino, dating to 1517 and now in the Galleria Nazionale dell'Umbria in Perugia.

It was probably produced for Santa Maria dei Servi church in Perugia, where it remained until 1542. This church was one of the most notable in the city and housed the chapels of the Baglioni family and other notable families in the city. It was demolished in the 1540s to make way for the moat of the Rocca Paolina and the Servites moved to the church of Santa Maria Nuova with their large collection of artworks, including Transfiguration, which was moved into that church's Graziani chapel, where it stayed until moving to its present home in 1863.

The upper register shows Christ standing on a cloud in a contrapposto pose within a double mandorla and a ring of seraphim. Beside him are Moses and Elijah, kneeling on the same cloud. In the lower register are the apostles John (kneeling), Peter and James (to the right). In the background is a landscape. The composition largely reworks existing drawings made by Perugino, with the two registers and the mandorla originally used in his now lost Assumption in the Sistine Chapel. It is also directly influenced by his Collegio del Cambio Transfiguration fresco in the Sala delle Udienze del Collegio del Cambio, also in Perugia.

== Bibliography ==
- (in Italian) Vittoria Garibaldi, Perugino, in Pittori del Rinascimento, Scala, Florence, 2004 ISBN 88-8117-099-X
- R. Van Marle The Development of the Italian Schools of painting, 1923-1938, volume XIV, p. 388.
