= Palazzo della Provincia e della Prefettura =

Public palace of Perugia

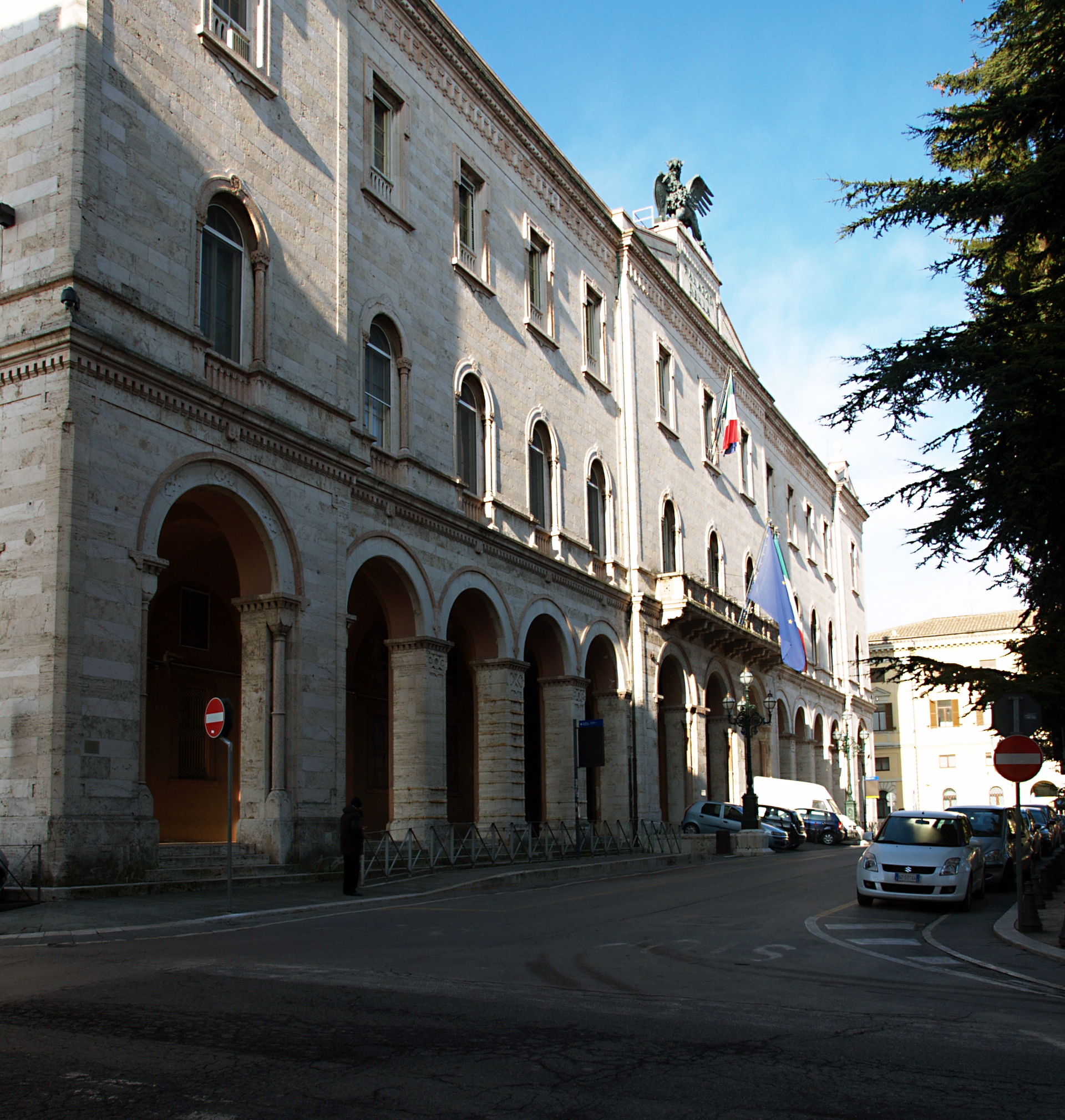
- Interactive map of the Palazzo della Provincia e della Prefettura area

General information
- Architectural style: Lombard, late medieval and early Renaissance
- Location: Piazza Italia, Perugia, Italy
- Construction started: 1867
- Completed: 1873

Design and construction
- Architect: Alessandro Arienti

The Palazzo della Provincia e della Prefettura is a public palace of Perugia built over the ruin of the Rocca Paolina.

== History ==
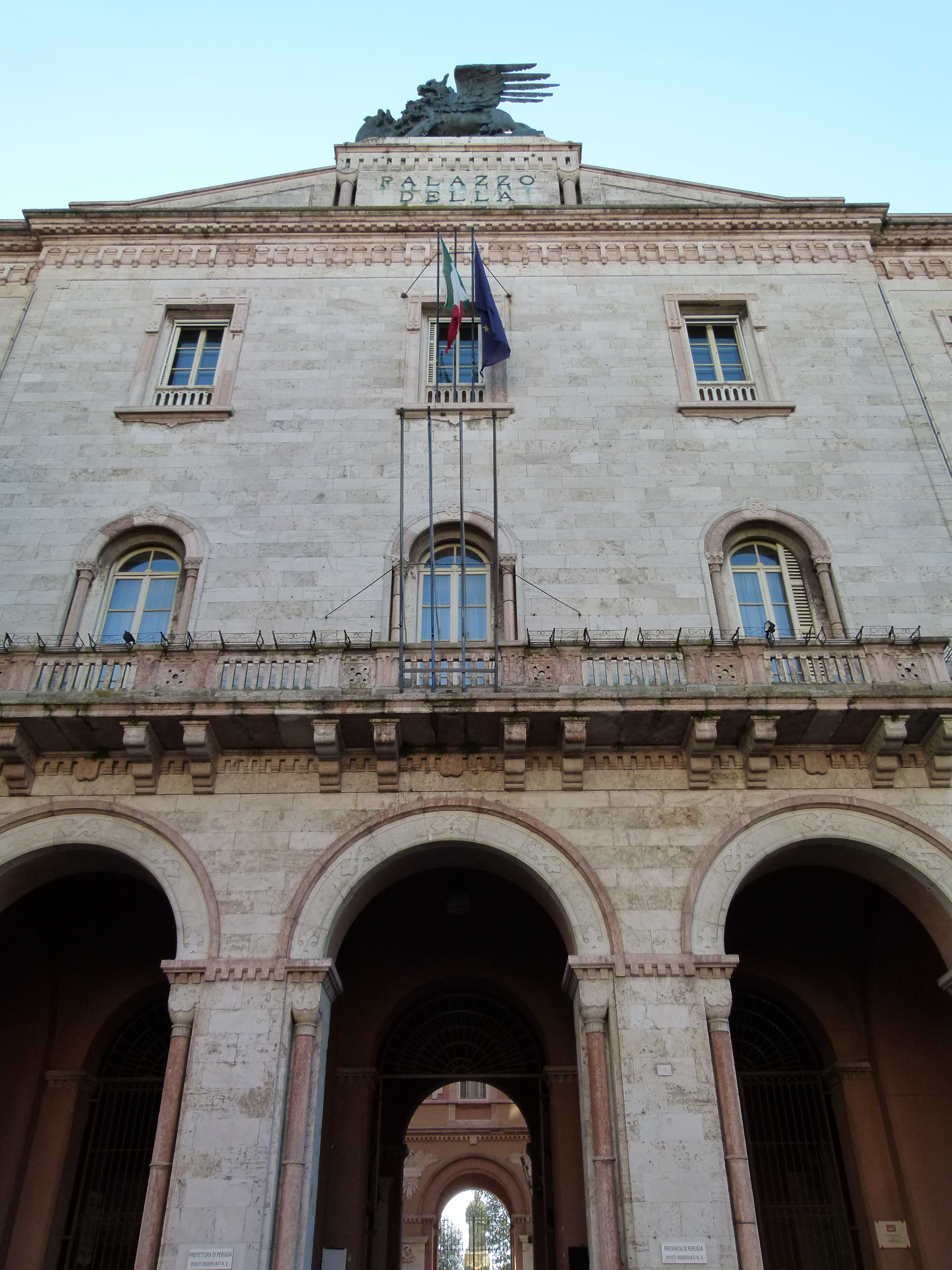
Palazzo della Provincia e Prefettura by Alessandro Arienti (1867-1873)

The Palazzo della Provincia e della Prefettura of Perugia has been built, by the municipal administration, to fill the empty space due to the demolition of the Rocca Paolina; it has therefore its bases above the ruin of the Rocca. Originally the purpose of this public building was not defined, it was thought for the Academy of Fine Arts; for this reason It had an anonymous name: “Palazzo Nuovo” (New Palace) or “la Fabbrica di Mezzo” (the factory in the centre) because it was built in the central area occupied by the Rocca's ruins, where others private buildings were built immediately afterwards.

The project was by Alessandro Arienti, a civil engineer of the municipality of Perugia and it can be dated back to 1867. A “foreigner” name, even if naturalized of Perugia, was chosen to avoid criticism due to rivalry between the local architects. The project recalls the northern public buildings style, but it is assimilated with the typical Umbrian colours, white and pink, due to the use of local stones. Arienti, who studied at the Academy of Fine Arts of Brera, for this work decided to use Lombard and neo-Bramante architectural forms, which were more appropriate for the spirit of the Risorgimento. He decided to retrieve with his eclecticism the late medieval and pre-renaissance decorations. Arienti rejected the golden style of Roman XV century, which characterized the first projects of Palazzo Nuovo, because that style recalled the ancient papal regime. The first projects, presented in the contests of 1860 and 1863 by the local architects, recalled the “Roman style only for the purpose of the stylistic homogeneity with the pre-existent Palazzo Donini”.

Arienti's work at that time was considered out of place and was the cause of a lot of controversy between his peers. The building, in addition to being considered out of context, was considered too low for its bulk. The opponents were especially the architects Gugliemo Calderini and Nazareno Biscarini, both from Umbria, who saw their project refused. Considering the difficulty of building above the ruin of a centuries-old stratification -remember that the Palace's bases lie on the basement of the fort Paolino- the project presents interesting positive sides:

1. The palace facades, facing the four cardinal points, are all four visible and equally important; an unusual thing for a medieval city like Perugia. The main entrance is on the long side facing the square while the backside faces the public panoramic viewpoint, the same panorama which inspired Giosuè Carducci (the gardens take his name) in writing “Il canto dell’amore”.
2. The palace bulk for its width exceeds all other palaces in the square, but the arcade along the perimeter gives transparency, lightness and airiness.
3. The palace height and consequently its floors (3 levels including ground floor) were determined by the height of the preceding building, correlating the new palace with the Palazzo Donini.
4. The organization of the inside spaces was projected in a flexible way with axial linearity because at the time of planning the purpose of the Palace was not yet defined. Proof of this is its definition as a civic and political pole; the decorations of the insides were made afterwards, between 1872 and 1873. The palace houses the Prefecture, the Prefetto residence and the offices of the Provincia.
5. Despite the bulkiness of the palace, the costs of its construction were limited; the bricks and stones of the Rocca Paolina were recycled for this very reason.

== Architecture ==
The facade is organized by means of horizontal lines that alternate two-tones areas of pink stone and white travertine. Near the entrance and by the corners the building slightly moves forward to highlight the entry and give plasticity to the facade. The base is composed of great round arches, which recall the classic Roman style. The arcade, as in a peristyle around the cell of a temple, makes the building levitate over the view where the gaze can be lost and "you can breathe an air of regained freedom".

The arcade is connected with the courtyard of the building, with various commemorative plaques as a proof of the sacredness of the place.

Three central arches of the arcade facing the square constitute the entry, above which there is a loggia. The first-floor windows are flanked by little columns of pink stone, with a round arch on top, while the second-floor windows have an architrave.

A Lombard cornice adorns the attic. On the corners of the attic, there are gables with spires; in the centre a trapezoidal gable with a griffin statue, symbol of the city and of the new Provincia of Umbria, which included the whole territory of Umbria and also of Rieti and the Sabina (until 5 April 1923).

== Interior decorations ==
The decoration of the insides was made between 1870 and 1875 and by a team of 6 local painters: Domenico Bruschi, Mariano Piervittori, Matteo Tassi, Giovanni Panti, Marzio Cherubini and Nicola Benvenuti. The paintings, rich in symbolism, are on the unification of Italy, with many instances of local history.

The Palace piano nobile (first floor) has 4 rooms, where the pictorial decoration has been made with particular attention; especially 2 rooms, the Sala del Consiglio (Council's room) and the Sala dei ricevimenti (meeting's room), were painted under the supervision of Domenico Bruschi.

The Sala del Consiglio recalls the ornamental motif of the external facade, also in the background pink colour of the stone; it is an overflow of decoration with gold profusion and glare of coloured light from the glass window. The vault has above a circular loggia on top of which, in the centre, a big glass window, divided in 8 compartments with ornamental geometrical motif, by Francesco Moretti (1873). The vault too is divided in 8 segments, in each quatrefoil frames Bruschi represented 8 female personification, reminding the allegories by Veronese in Palazzo Ducale, Venezia; for these reasons it was defined in “stile neo veneto” (neo-venetian style). Six allegories represent the Umbrian and Sabine cities on which the jurisdiction of the Provincia extended (Perugia, Foligno, Rieti, Orvieto, Terni and Spoleto). Perugia is represented with, on the background, the palace of the Provincia, with the historic date of 20 June 1859 and of men who made the city great. The last two figures are the allegories of the “Provincia” and of “Italy”. As a symbol of dignified respect of the local territory to the national territory, the Provincia is represented as a noble young girl, who doesn't dare meet the gaze of “Italy”. After this job, Bruschi will be hired in other cities to paint similar pieces: in Cagliari, Bari, Palazzo Montecitorio and Palazzo Madama in Rome.

In the Sala del Consiglio, 4 busts of illustrious personalities of the Umbrian risorgimento (Cesare Fani, Luigi Pianciani, Zeffirino Faina, Francesco Guardabassi), a fifth one is dedicated to Benedetto Maramotti, prefectural guide of administration in the first period after the unity.

In 1921 the provincial council was broken up by the fascist government and changes to the palace were made; for this reason new functions for the inside spaces were established. Luckily without changing the decoration.

The second meeting room, placed in the area reserved for the prefecture, is decorated by Bruschi (1874) with paintings representing fake tapestry, meant to expand the space as in Roman wall painting of the XV century. These paintings are framed with fake red and gold velvet and architectural frames decorated with festoon and puttis. The content of each tapestry is related to a personality who made the city great, in various crafts. The decoration is completed by ten lunettes which illustrate the life of those personalities.

Among the other rooms, the “galleria meridionale” (southern Gallery) is rather remarkable; inside Mariano Piervittori painted the decoration “a grottesche” (particular type of wall decoration) with scene “di genere” (of daily life) related to episodes of the local history.

Noteworthy also the Sala degli Stemmi (Emblem Room), with emblems of the main cities of Umbria painted by Matteo Tassi. Finally the Sala delle riunioni della Deputazione Provinciale with decoration of Giovanni Panti, and other minor rooms painted a grottesche by Marzio Cherubini.

== Collection Straka-Coppa ==
Since 1985 the Provincia has been the owner of the collection Straka-Coppa, by Maria Teresa Straka-Coppa and Francesco Coppa; it includes pieces of the period between the end of the XIX century and the present day, but also ancient pieces as two little paintings of the XIII century by artists from the school of Siena; Italian paintings and furniture of XVI and XVII century. The collection cannot at the moment be seen.

== CERP- Centro Espositivo Rocca Paolina ==
Along the west side of the arcade, going down with the escalator you can visit CERP (the Exhibition Centre of Rocca Paolina).

In 1985 in the basement of the palace was opened the centro espositivo CERP (exhibition centre) of Provincia of Perugia, where cultural events and important exhibitions of the region take place.

== See also ==
- Province of Perugia
- Rocca Paolina
- Domenico Bruschi
