= Salt War =

Salt War (Italian: Guerra del sale) may refer to:

- Salt War (1304), between Venice and Padua
- War of Ferrara (1482–1484), also called the Salt War, between Venice and Ferrara
- Salt War (1540), between Perugia and the Papal States
- Salt War (1556–1557), between Naples and the Papal States
- Salt War (1680–1699), a series of rebellions in the Duchy of Savoy
- San Elizario Salt War (1877–1878), a range war in the United States
