= Castello di Monterone (Monterone Castle) =

Restored 13th-century castle in Perugia, Italy

Coordinates: 43°6′43.56″N 12°23′19.68″E

Castello di Monterone, known also as Castello Piceller, is a small restored 13th-century castle in Perugia, Italy. It is located in the road that connects Perugia to Assisi, through Ponte San Giovanni. Very close to the Monastery of San Pietro and to the Church of San Bevignate, this street is one of the "royal roads", that led out of the town through the main gates of Perugia, along a road network already used by the Etruscans and Romans.

== Origins of the name and first settlements ==
The area's name is thought to derive from Monturreno or Mons Turrenius, that derives from Turrena, the medieval name given to Perugia, due to the presence of numerous defensive towers.

The area was first settled around the 3rd century BC; a travertine ossuary was found in the garden of the castle together with three bronze mirrors discovered by Mauro Faina: one of those represent the mythological figures of Peleus and Thetys.

The main block of the castle dates to the 13th century. In the Perugia's archives there is a document dated 18 January 1200 certifies that Gerardo di Ugolino di Alberico, making himself an official citizen of Perugia, submitted his properties in the hill of "Montarone" to the consul Bernarduccio. Father Felice Ciatti in "Memorie Annali et Historiche delle cose di Perugia" (1638), writes: Gerardo di Ghislerio di Alberico, on 14 January, wanting to be a Perugia citizen, submitted the land he had near the hill Montirreno - called Montarone, and every thing he had in the area of Perugia, swearing he would like to stay under the Perugia jurisdiction and whole its rules...

== Templars knights and Monterone castle ==
Until their abolition in 1312, the Templar Knights were linked to the castle. The Templars owned the Monastery of San Bevignate. The rumors and the proximity of the church to the castle make us think that catholic pilgrims received hospitality in that building, being itself submitted to the Order.

Lupattelli wrote in 1899: "Being Templars Knights in San Bevignate from 1200 until 1312, we can assume that the land submitted by Gerardo di Ghislerio to Perugia would include his main house, the castle, where he hosted the lay pilgrims, as they had found in it a monastic institution. So, the ancient building depended by the temple of S.Bevignate and by the Monastery where it was settled the fourth Order of Priests". According to the tradition, there should be underground passages that connect Castello di Monterone to the Church of San Bevignate. After 1312, the Castello di Monterone was probably abandoned for a long time.

== Medieval period ==
During this period, the castle was used as watch-tower in order to protect and control the access to the town. Between the 14th and 16th centuries, many wars affected Perugia. The main struggle for the power was between Raspanti (artisans working class) and Beccherini (the people sustaining the noble class). This internal tense situation involved more parties (Pope, Milan Lordship) that were all interested in taking the control on the town. For this reason, Castello di Monterone was seriously damaged by military attacks, especially by Braccio da Montone and Malatesta Baglioni (in 1416 and 1582 respectively).

From the 17th century, the castle was likely abandoned then inhabited for at least three centuries and maybe it was modified according to the owners’ needs. At the end of the 18th century, the castle was property of Counts Ansidei; in the 19th century it was bought by the Piceller family.

== Castello di Monterone in modern history ==
Piceller family, who has origins in S. Ulrico, Val Gardena (now it is Ortisei), moved to Perugia at the end of 1600; here, they acquired lands and properties and established Castello di Monterone as the family residence. Many were the members of the family who had artistic or social merit, like Giuseppe, friend of Francesco Morlacchi, an important flautist and founder of the first music band in Perugia, Bernardino Piceller, painter and drawer of many historic and religious subjects. At the beginnings of 1800, Piceller family was enriched by the trade of ironware with Epiteto di Cristoforo. The son of Epiteto, Alessandro, is a very important character in the history of Castello di Monterone. Archaeologist for pleasure and antiquarian, Alessandro restored and extended the castle in the same way he did with the "Casetta Piceller", a 14th-century chapel situated in Collestrada, restored and re-adapted into a little country-house.

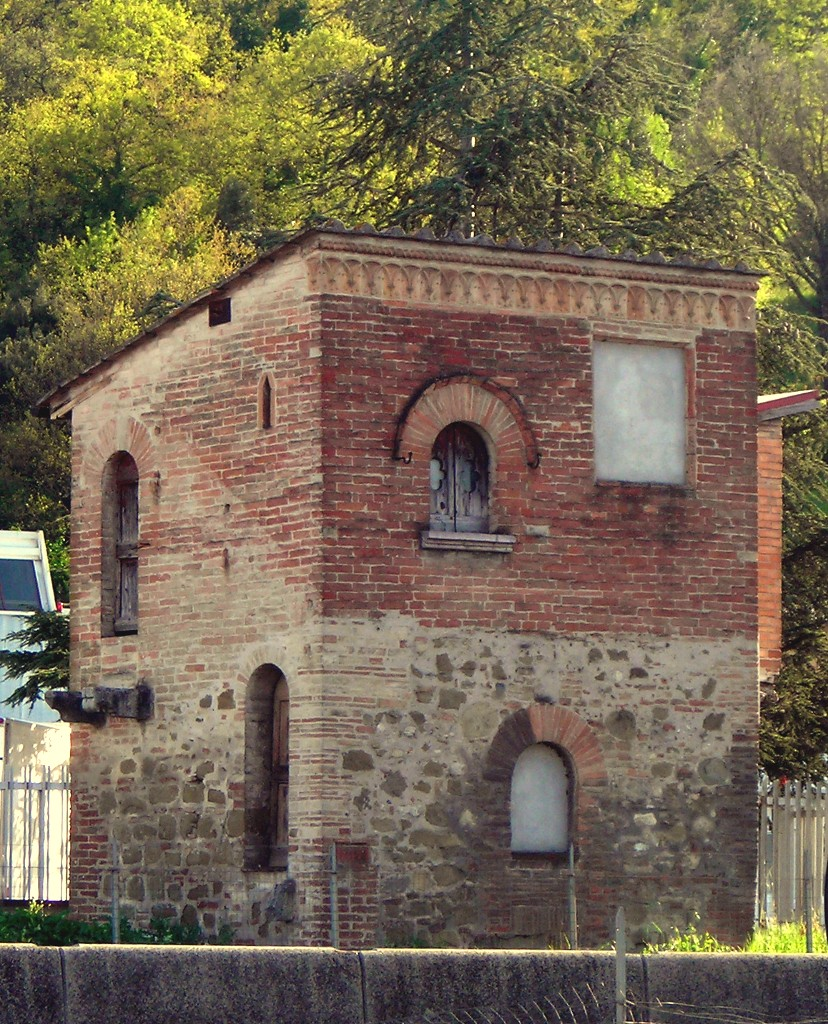
Casetta Piceller

Restoration works were directed by Filippo Lardoni and Alessandro Arienti. On 23 November 1849, the bishop Vincenzo Gioacchino Pecci (he will become Pope Leone XIII) inaugurated the castle. Alessandro Piceller did not only restored the ancient medieval building but he enriched it with many artistic and architectural elements (bas-reliefs, statues, a little rose, balconies, mullioned windows and so many other objects from different historic periods. The cloister, delimited by columns and marble capitals (these were collected by the same Alessandro Piceller) was decorated by urns, etruscan bas-reliefs of great historic importance. Castello di Monterone is something unique just because of this mix of styles, romantic elements and materials (sandstone, brick, stone) and it is different from the other XIX examples of Umbria. Among the main pieces of art inside the castle, we must mention the frescoes representing the signs of the main characters of the late middle age fights for the power, painted by Matteo Tassi, who realised also the Sala dei Notari inside the Palazzo dei Priori; the fresco representing The Madonna of Loreto with Saints Peter and Paul, is attributed to Jacopo da Foligno. On 20 October 1929, Alessandro Piceller died and after his death and the castle was abandoned again. During World War II it hosted displaced people and the bombs heavily ruined the building. The Castle was restored after the war.
