= Salt War (1540) =

1540 rebellion of Perugia against the Papal States over a salt tax

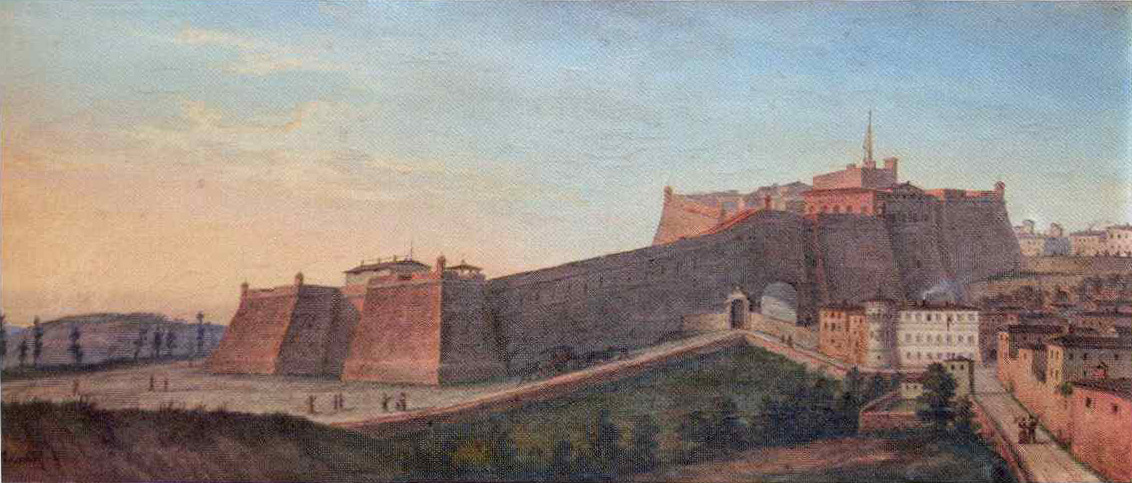
View of the Rocca Paolina (Pauline Fortress), constructed as a result of the Salt War of 1540.

The Salt War of 1540 was a result of an insurrection by the city of Perugia against the Papal States during the pontificate of Pope Paul III. The principal result was the city of Perugia's definitive subordination to papal control.

== History ==
Perugia had been a free commune until 1370, when it was de jure incorporated into the Papal States. The Perugian elite continued to enjoy a sort of semi-autonomy, including several privileges like trial by a local (not papal-appointed) judge and freedom from paying any taxes on salt, then an important product for preserving food. Beginning in the late 15th century, successive popes attempted to rein in Perugian autonomy, despite resistance by the Perugians. This came to a head after a disastrous harvest in 1539, which drove up prices in Perugia and its rural hinterland.

In this already economically difficult situation, Pope Paul III decided to levy a new tax on salt for all his subjects. This violated treaties between Perugia and previous popes, treaties which Paul III had confirmed at the beginning of his pontificate, but Perugian protests were to no avail. The Perugians decided to rebel but on 4 June 1540 papal troops, led by the pope's son Pierluigi Farnese and his condottiere Alessandro da Terni, forced a surrender.

Shortly thereafter, an enormous fortress, the Rocca Paolina (Pauline Fortress), was constructed on the plans designed by Antonio and Aristotele da Sangallo. Built not to protect Perugia but, in Julius III's words, "to slow down the burning of the Perugians and get rid of the opportunity to rebel against the Holy See," the fort was for centuries a symbol of oppressive papal rule. Despite the fact that a later Pope, Julius III, gave the Perugians back a semblance of local rule in 1559, the city became part of the Papal States and remained so until Italian unification in 1860.

One curious note about the war is that Perugian legend holds that as part of a popular protest against the new papal tax in 1540, citizens stopped putting salt in their bread (unsalted bread is the norm to this day). Recent research suggests that this is an urban legend developed after 1860.

== See also ==
- Papal States
- Perugia

== Bibliography ==
- M. Symonds, The Story of Perugia, J.M. Dent & Sons, London, 1912.
- L. Bonazzi, Storia di Perugia, vol. II, 1879, Ris. Città di Castello 1960.
- D. Bonella, A. Brunori, & A. Ciliani, La Rocca Paolina nella storia e nella realtà contemporanea, Guerra Edizioni, Perugia, 2002.
- M. Rita Zappelli, Caro Viario: Un viaggio nella vecchia Perugia attraverso le sue mura, porte, vie e piazza, Guerra Edizioni, Perugia, 1999.
