= Maria Aurelia Tasso =

Benedictine nun

Maria Aurelia Tasso or Tassis (died 1750) was a Benedictine nun at the monastery of Santa Grata in Bergamo. She likely derives from the same Bergamese family as Torquato Tasso. She wrote a hagiography on Santa Grata of Bergamo, putatively a 4th century saint. In that text she comments on Bernardo Tasso's sister Dona Affra, who also was a member of the same monastery.
