= Collegio del Cambio frescos =

Series of frescos by Perugino

The Collegio del Cambio frescos are a series of allegorical fresco paintings in the Audience Chamber (Sala delle Udienze) of the Collegio del Cambio in Perugia, painted by Perugino.

== History ==
In 1452 the Arte del Cambio was authorised to set up a headquarters near the fringes of the palazzo dei Priori. They built the building between 1452 and 1457. In 1496 they decided to commission Perugino to decorate the building's Audience Chamber. He was then among the most in-demand artists in Italy, leading studios in both Florence and Perugia.

They signed the contract with the painter on 26 January 1496, though he mainly worked on the cycle in 1498, finishing it in 1500. His assistants on the project included Andrea d'Assisi and probably the young Raphael for the figure of Strength and the face of Solomon. He was paid 350 gold ducats on 11 June 1507. Vasari praised it in his Lives of the Artists:

This very beautiful work was praised more than any other which Pietro [Vanucci] painted in Perugia, and today the inhabitants of this town value it as a memory of a highly esteemed representative of their fatherland.

== List ==
=== Transfiguration ===
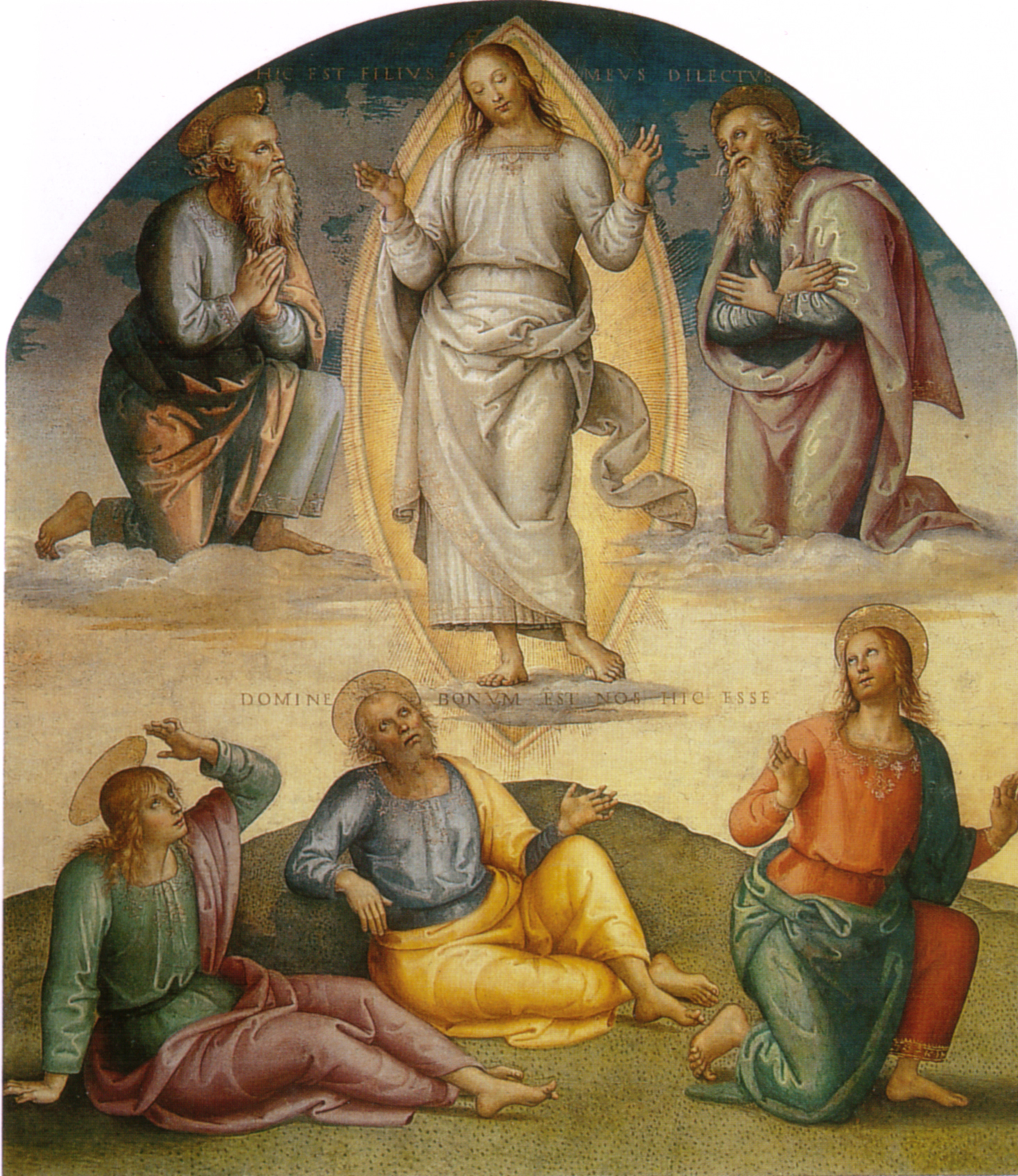
