= Edoardo Tassi =

Italian footballer (born 1998)

Personal information
- Date of birth: 10 June 1998 (age 28)
- Place of birth: Ascoli Piceno, Italy
- Height: 1.85 m (6 ft 1 in)
- Position: Forward

Team information
- Current team: Jesina

Youth career
- –2016: Virtus Lanciano
- 2016: → Torino (loan)
- 2016–2018: Ascoli

Senior career*
Years	Team	Apps	(Gls)
2017–2021	Ascoli	0	(0)
2018–2019	→ Reggina (loan)	25	(5)
2019–2020	→ Fano (loan)	6	(0)
2021–2022	Viterbese	6	(1)
2022	Fermana	7	(1)
2022–2023	RG Ticino		
2023	Monte Prodeco	7	(3)
2023	Portogruaro	3	(0)
2024	Rotonda	2	(0)
2024	Fano		
2024–2025	Civitanovese	4	(0)
2025	Atletico Mariner		
2025	Torrese		
2025	Castelfidardo	0	(0)
2025–	Jesina		
- * Club domestic league appearances and goals as of 25 October 2025

Edoardo Tassi (born 10 June 1998) is an Italian footballer who plays as a forward for Eccellenza club Jesina.

== Club career ==
=== Ascoli ===
After stints at the junior teams of Virtus Lanciano and Torino, he joined Ascoli in the summer of 2016 and played for their Under-19 team in the 2016–17 and 2017–18 seasons. He made spot appearances on the bench for the senior squad in 2016–17 and 2017–18 Serie B seasons, but did not see any field time. He made his debut for the senior squad on 4 August 2018 in a Coppa Italia 0–4 home loss against Viterbese as a 66th-minute substitute for Simone Andrea Ganz.

==== Loan to Reggina ====
On 30 August 2018, he joined Serie C club Reggina on a season-long loan. He made his Serie C debut for Reggina on 18 September 2018 in a game against Trapani as a 58th-minute substitute for Mattia Bonetto.

==== Loan to Fano ====
On 14 August 2019, he joined Fano in the Serie C on a season-long loan.

=== Viterbese ===
On 1 February 2021 he moved to Viterbese. On 28 January 2022, his contract with Viterbese was terminated by mutual consent.

=== Fermana ===
On 31 January 2022, Tassi signed with Fermana as a free agent.
