= Matteo Tassi =

Italian painter (1831–1895)

Matteo Tassi (October 6, 1831 in Perugia – 1895) was an Italian painter, best known for his decorative frescoes and restorations.

== Biography ==
His first studies were in his native Academy, then he moved to Rome to study perspective and decoration under professor Annibale Angelini at the Accademia di San Luca. In 1856, with Alessandro Mantovani, he worked on part of the restoration of the frescoes of the Vatican Loggia. From 1860 to 1864, he worked in Florence. He completed decorations in Civitavecchia, L'Aquila, at Teatro Comunale of Todi (where he worked alongside Alfonso Morganti), and the Teatro Imperiale of Pesaro.

In 1876, his former master Mantovani, obtained for him another commission to fresco a third Vatican Loggia, with frescoes depicting vedute of Rome. He also painted fresco decorations in Amelia and Recanati From 1880–1882, he pursued decoration of the dining room, sitting-room, and an antique salon in the palace of the Prince di Monaco.

But much of his work was completed in Perugia. He painted in casa Tambaldi, and at the Cassa di Risparmio of Gallenga, and to the train station and church of San Costanzo, the latter which he completed in Byzantine style. In Perugia, he painted the ceilings of two cafes : Baduel (torn down) and the Caffè Melinelli In 1883 to 1885, he labored in the painstakingly slow restoration of the few remaining antique frescoes of the Great Hall of the Palazzo del Popolo in Perugia. He also frescoed in the Theater della Sapienza in Perugia, and a ceiling fresco with an allegorical depiction of Sogno (Dream) in the theater Morlacchi of Perugia.

For his own works he painted landscapes and some depictions from the stories of Dante. He displayed works at exhibitions in Florence (1867, 1878–1880), Genoa (1868–1871), Milan (1871) and Turin (1880).
