= Rocca Paolina =

Renaissance fortress in Perugia, Italy

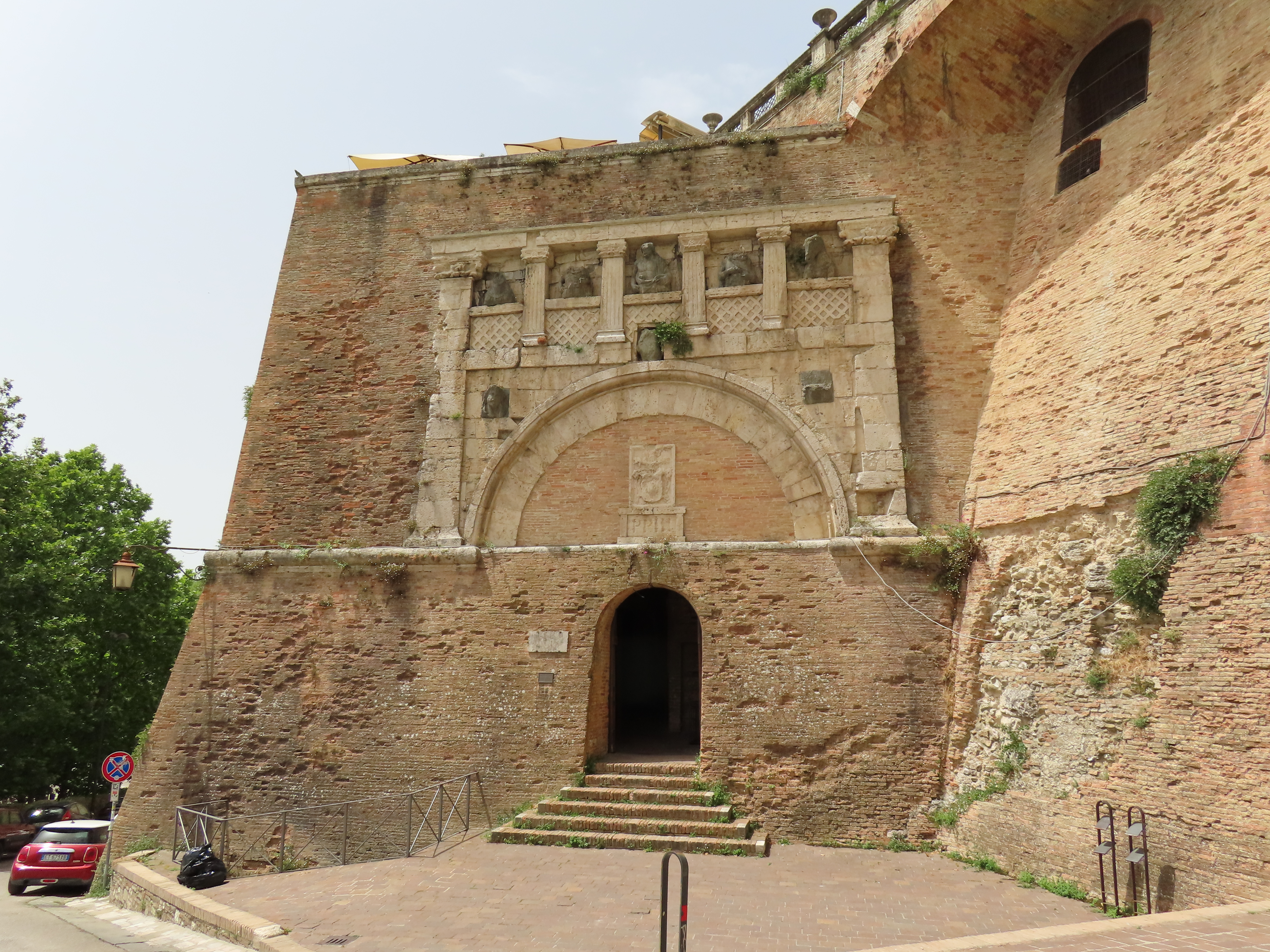
Rocca Paolina, Perugia.

The Rocca Paolina was a Renaissance fortress in Perugia, built between 1540 and 1543 by order of Pope Paul III, based on designs by Antonio da Sangallo the Younger. Its construction entailed the destruction of a significant part of the historic city, including Etruscan, Roman, and medieval structures. Among the demolished buildings were the residences of the Baglioni family in the burgh of Santa Giuliana, along with over a hundred tower-houses, gates, churches, and monasteries. Former city streets were transformed into underground passageways, which are now accessible to the public.

The fortress was partially destroyed during uprisings in 1848, rebuilt by Pope Pius IX in 1860, and finally demolished in 1861 following Perugia's annexation by the Kingdom of Italy. The underground via Bagliona and remnants of the medieval quarter were uncovered and restored in 1932, with further work undertaken in 1965. Today, part of the original supporting wall remains visible on viale Indipendenza, while a bastion on via Marzia has been repurposed as an exhibition space and museum.

== Gallery ==
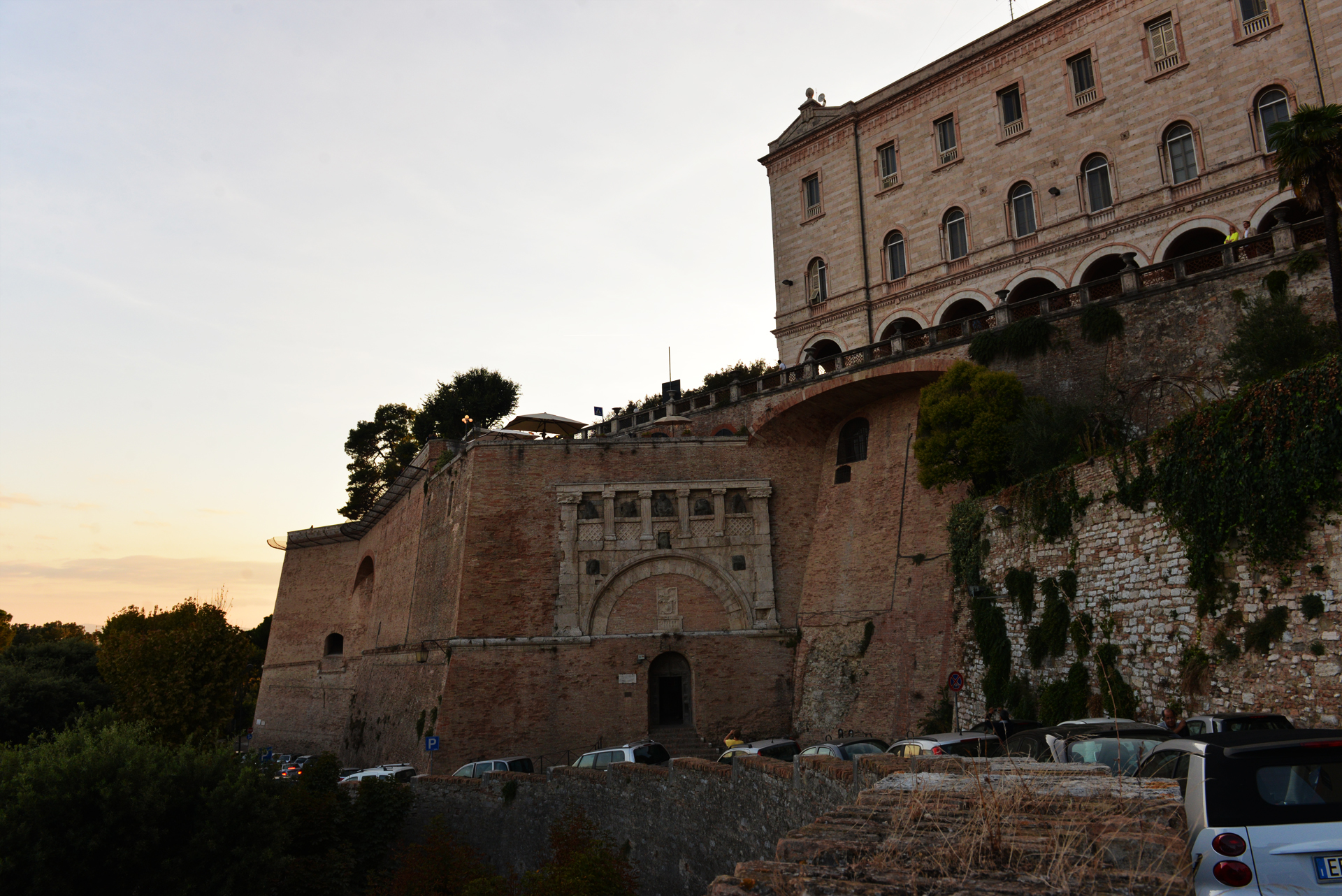
The Rocca Paolina and Porta Marzia

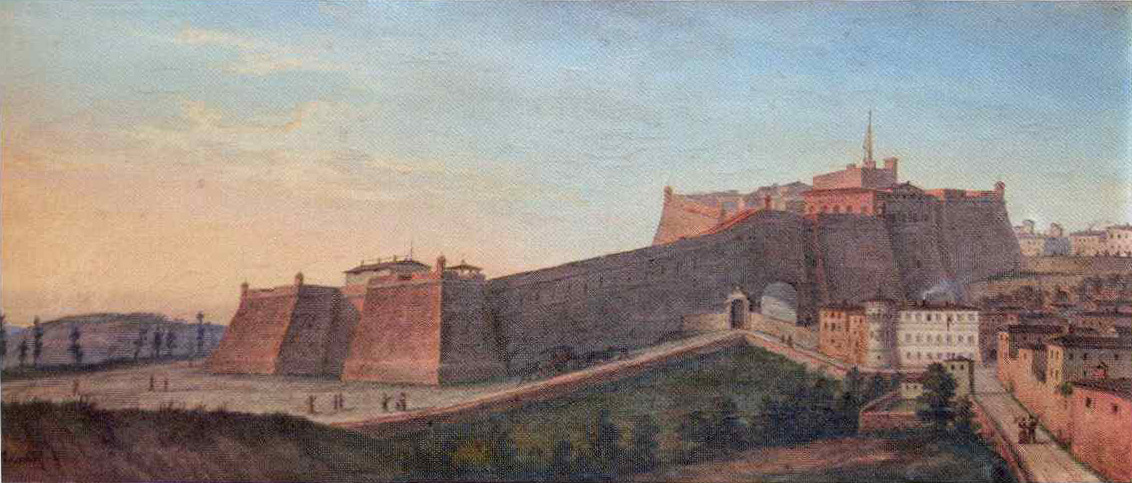
19th-century painting by Giuseppe Rossi (National Gallery of Umbria)

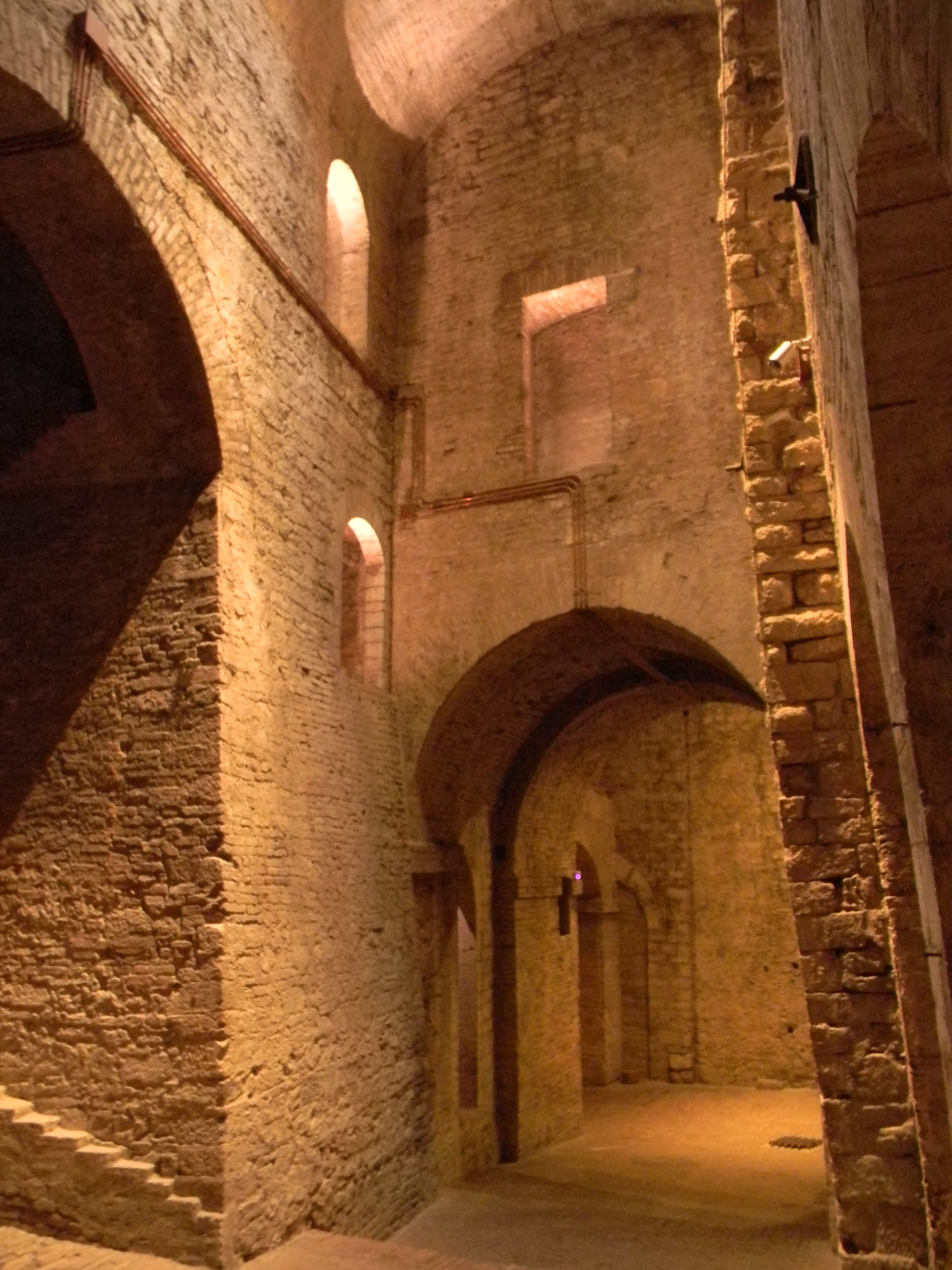
Interior passageways of the fortress

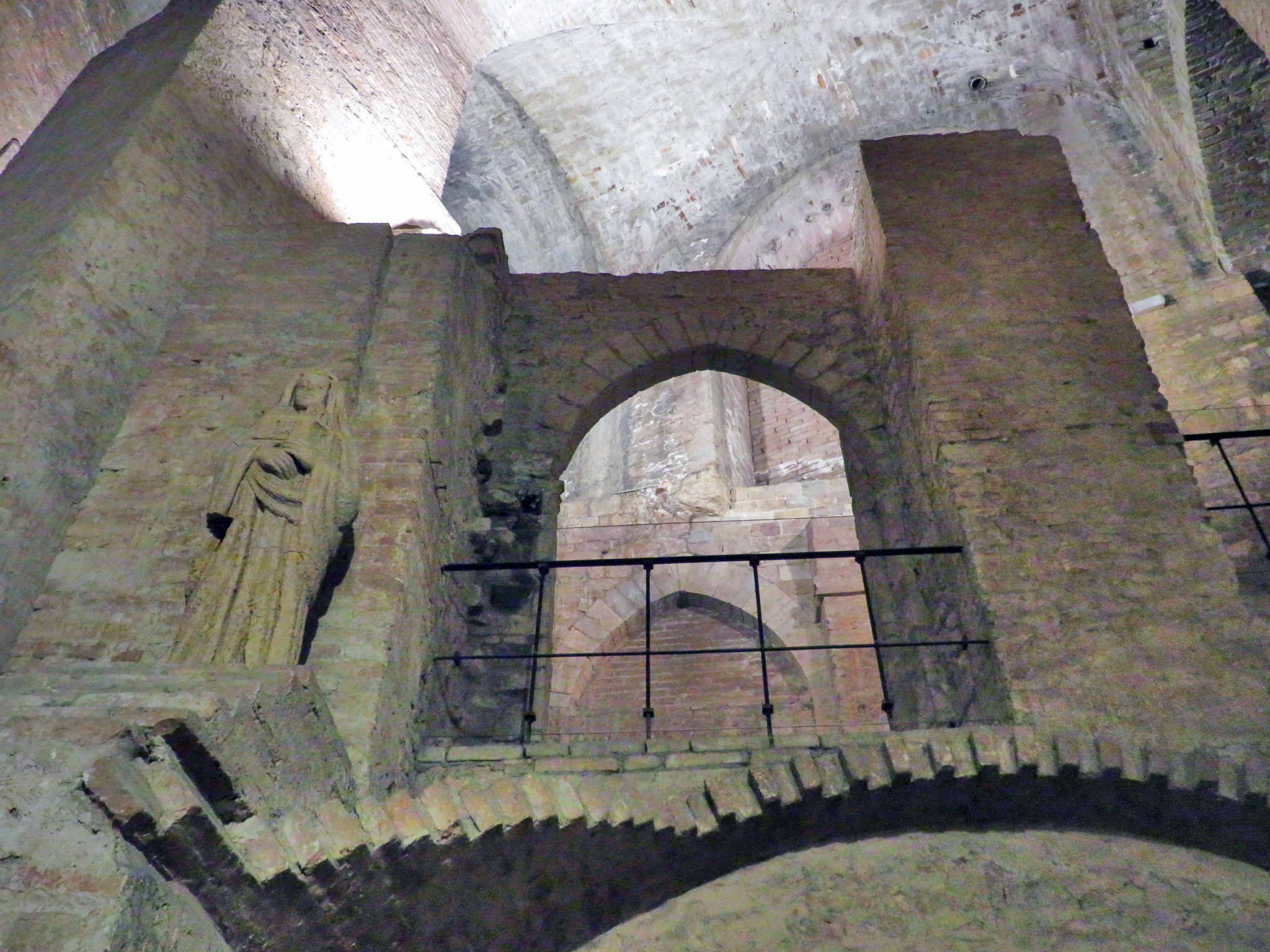
Underground section of the Rocca Paolina.

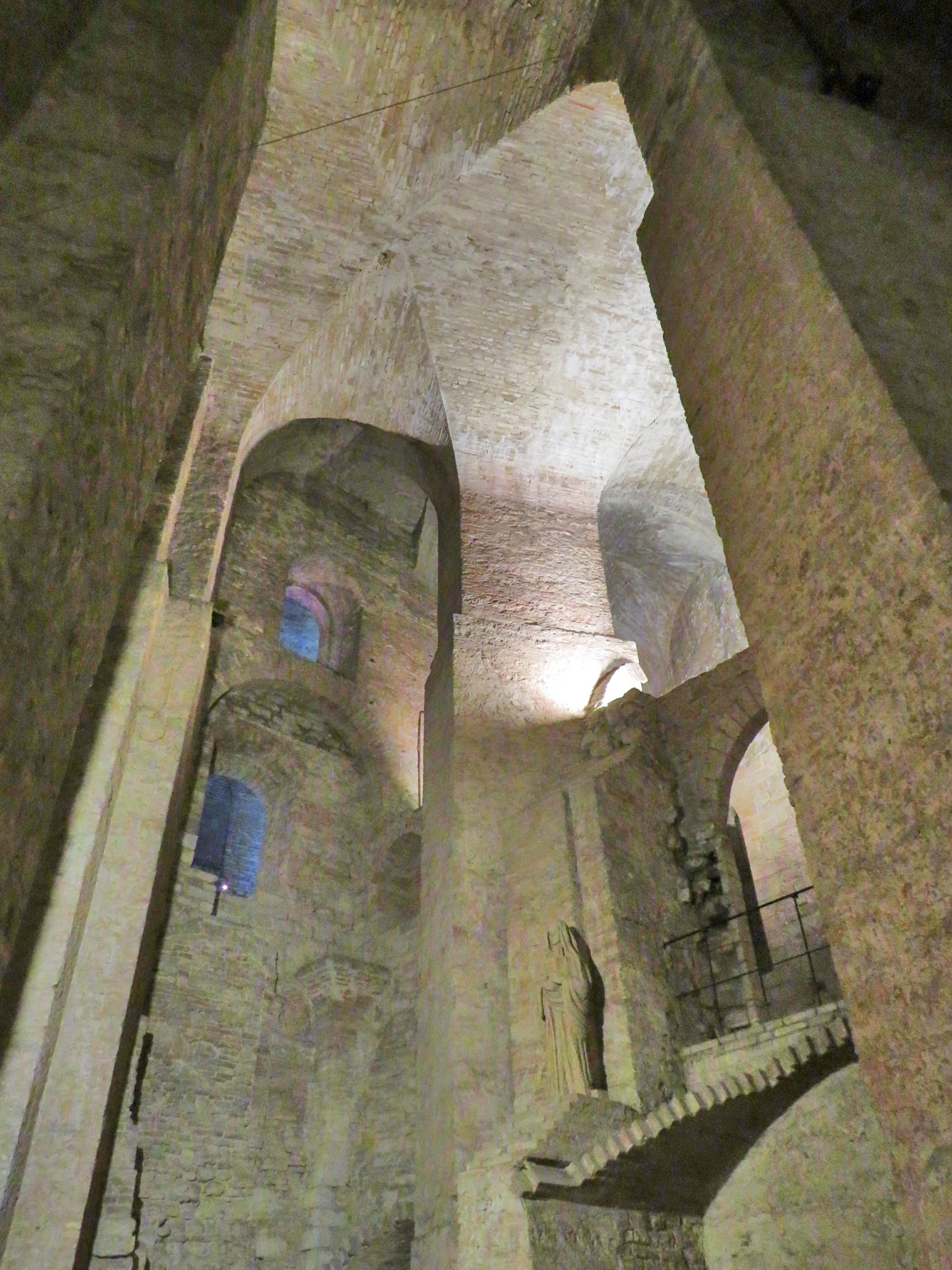
Medieval passageways inside the Rocca Paolina.
