= Sacred Conversation (disambiguation) =

Sacred conversation is a genre developed in Italian Renaissance painting.

Sacred Conversation may also refer to:

- Madonna and Child with Saint Catherine and Saint Mary Magdalene, by Giovanni Bellini (c. 1490), now in the Gallerie dell'Accademia, Venice
- Madonna and Child with Saint Mary Magdalene and Saint Ursula, by Giovanni Bellini (1490), now in the Museo del Prado, Madrid
- Sacred Conversation (Bellini, Madrid, 1505–1510), by Giovanni Bellini, now in the Thyssen-Bornemisza Museum, Madrid
