= Madonna and Child with Saint Mary Magdalene and Saint Ursula =

Painting by Giovanni Bellini

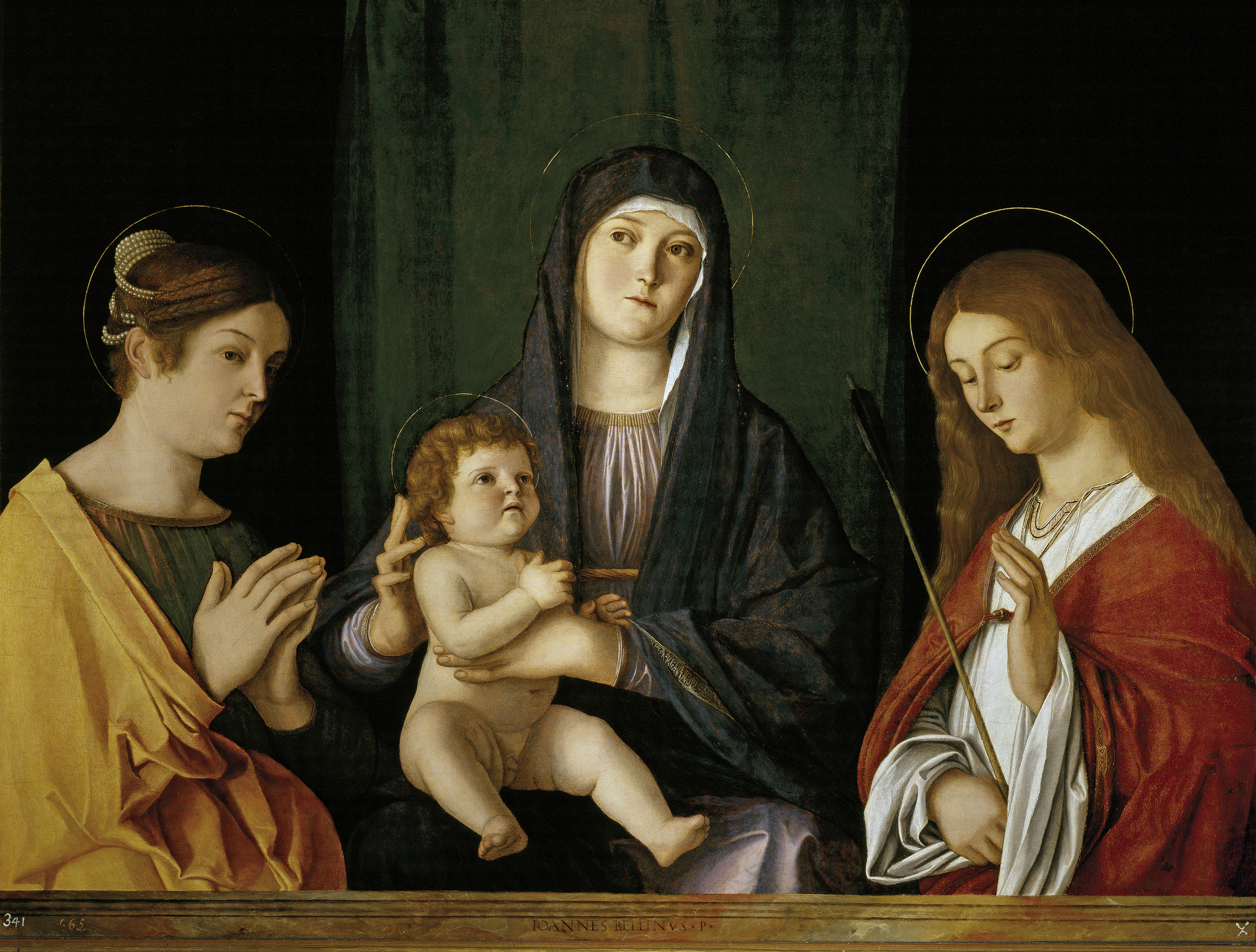
- Artist: Giovanni Bellini
- Year: 1490
- Medium: oil on panel
- Dimensions: 77 cm × 104 cm (30 in × 41 in)
- Location: Museo del Prado, Madrid

Madonna and Child with Saint Mary Magdalene and Saint Ursula or Virgin and Child with Saints Magdalene and Ursula is an oil on panel painting by Giovanni Bellini that belongs to the sacra conversazione genre and dates to 1490. The painting is also referred to as Sacred Conversation. It was previously in the collection of the painter Carlo Maratta, and is now in the Prado Museum in Madrid.

It is very similar to the same artist's Madonna and Child with Saint Catherine and Saint Mary Magdalene in the Gallerie dell'Accademia; they both formed part of a group of paintings which show the popularity of the genre, with several replicas, mostly from Bellini's studio or only partly by his own hand, including those in Urbino and the Pierrepont Morgan Library in New York. The Madrid example shows saint Mary Magdalene and saint Ursula.

== See also ==
- List of works by Giovanni Bellini
