= Saint George (Mantegna) =

1460 painting by Andrea Mantegna

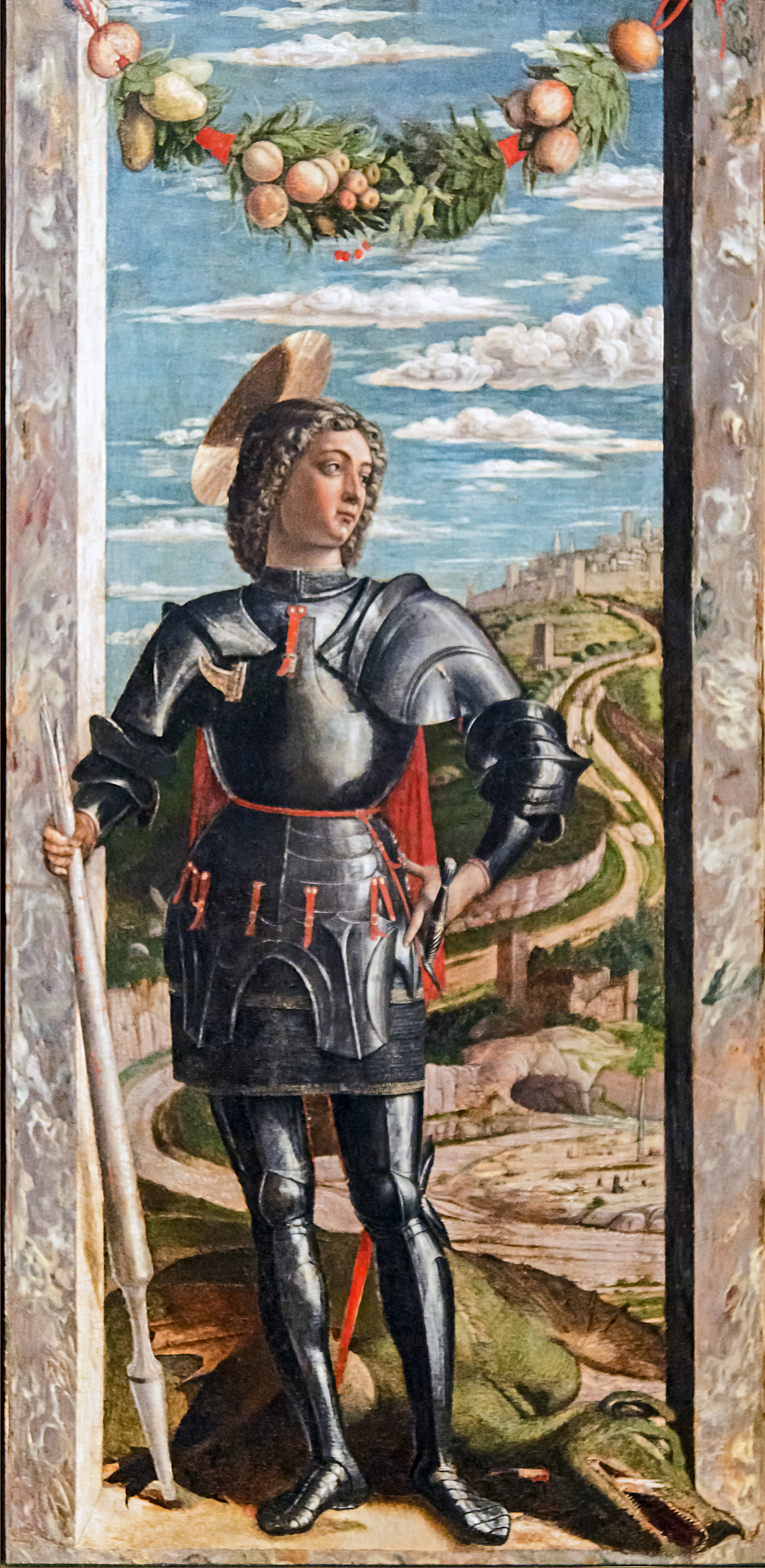
- Artist: Andrea Mantegna
- Year: 1460
- Medium: tempera on panel
- Dimensions: 66 cm × 32 cm (26 in × 13 in)
- Location: Gallerie dell'Accademia, Venice

Saint George is a 66 by 32 cm tempera on panel painting by Andrea Mantegna, dated to around 1460 and now in the Gallerie dell'Accademia in Venice. It shows the saint in armour and on foot, carrying the remains of the lance he has used to kill the dragon, who lies at his feet with the lance's point stuck in its jaw. There is a marble border down the left and right hand sides of the painting, though George's elbow protrudes over the left hand border and the dragon's head over the right-hand border - such illusions were a signature trait of Mantegna's work, especially between the end of his Paduan period (by 1459) and the start of his time in Mantua (from 1460). The garland at the top is a typical motive of the Squarcione school, referring back to Mantegna's time in Squarcione's studio in Padua during his youth, whilst in the right hand background a road leads to a walled hilltop city.
