= Saint John the Baptist (Titian) =

1540 painting by Titian

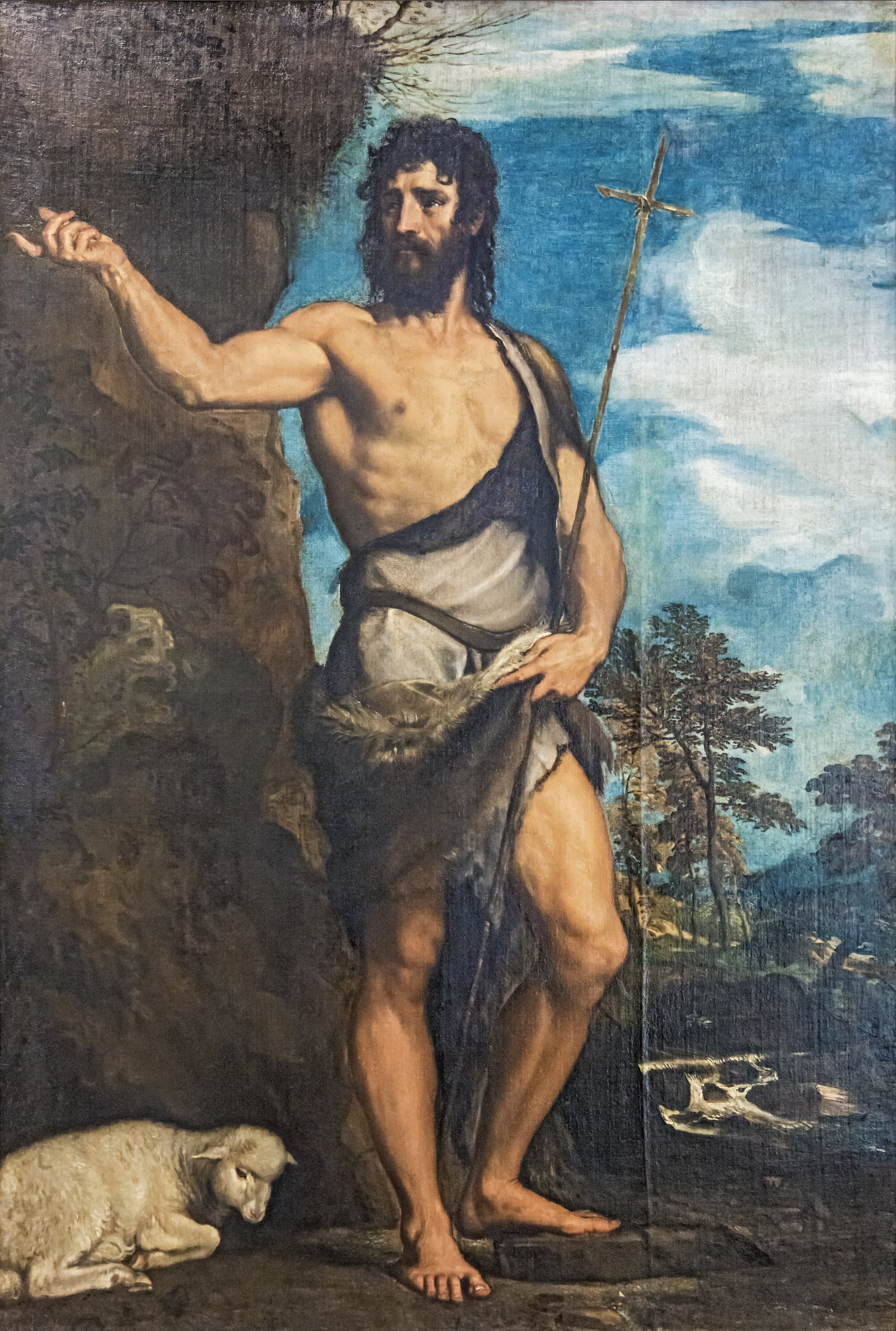
- Artist: Titian
- Year: 1540
- Medium: oil on canvas
- Dimensions: 201 cm × 134 cm (79 in × 53 in)
- Location: Gallerie dell'Accademia; Venice

Saint John the Baptist is an oil on canvas painting by Titian, from c. 1540. It depicts Saint John the Baptist with his traditional attributes of the Lamb of God and a staff. It was part of a former altarpiece. It is part of the collection of the Gallerie dell'Accademia, in Venice.

In the background of the painting is a landscape with the river Jordan, where Jesus was baptised.

== History ==
The painting adorned the altar of San Giovanni in the now extinct church of Santa Maria Maggiore, in Venice, from where it was removed and transferred to the Accademia, in 1807. There is no documentation on the dating of the altarpiece, but it is dated between the 1530s, for stylistic reasons, and 1557, the year in which it was described by Ludovico Dolce.

The work is also cited in the second edition of Giorgio Vasari's Lives (1568): "He made a painting of Saint John the Baptist in the desert among certain rocks for the church of Santa Maria Maggiore" (VI, 160)."

A plausible date seems to be 1540, in the period where the dialogue with the Tuscan-Roman "manner" was most intense. These stylistic features were appreciated by Vasari and Dolce, but not by some of the more modern critics: Roberto Longhi criticized a certain academicism (1946), Pallucchini spoke of "stagnation in the formulation of that muscular and evidently posed image"

== Description ==
The statuesque figure of John the Baptist stands out in the center of the altarpiece, while he raises his arm in his typical gesture of indicating Jesus; in this case it was the Sacrament in the central altar of the church. Half-naked, dressed in his hermit's animal skin and holding the staff of reeds tied to form a cross, he is accompanied by the typical attribute of the lamb and immersed in a wooded landscape. On the left, a cliff cuts vertically across the canvas and highlights, the figure of the Baptist, with its dark profile, giving depth to the entire composition. On the right, the view moves away in depth towards a waterfall, some leafy trees, mountains and thick clouds. The stream recalls John's baptismal mission. To make the protagonist stand out as much as possible, Titian uses a particularly low horizon, as had already been done before him.

The muscularity of the torso, the anatomy of the arm contracted in the gesture of raising himself, the plasticity of the powerful legs, the eloquence of the pose stand out in the depiction of the saint; they are all stylistic elements derived from a reinterpretation of classical art and above all from a long-distance dialogue with the art of Michelangelo and his followers, who in those years influenced the debate and artistic production of Italy and beyond. Titian was in fact seeking in those years a synthesis between the Tuscan tradition of drawing and plastic setting, and the Venetian tradition of rich chromatic orchestration. In this work, in fact, the dense and vibrant chromatic mixture, the brilliant tones and the richness of light effects stands out, after being enhanced by the 1981 restoration.

== See also ==
- List of works by Titian

== Bibliography ==
- (in Polish) Marion Kaminski "Sztuka i architektura Wenecja", wyd Wydawnictwo Olesiejuk ISBN 978-3-8331-2315-3
