= Martinengo Pietà =

Painting by Giovanni Bellini

The Martinengo Pietà
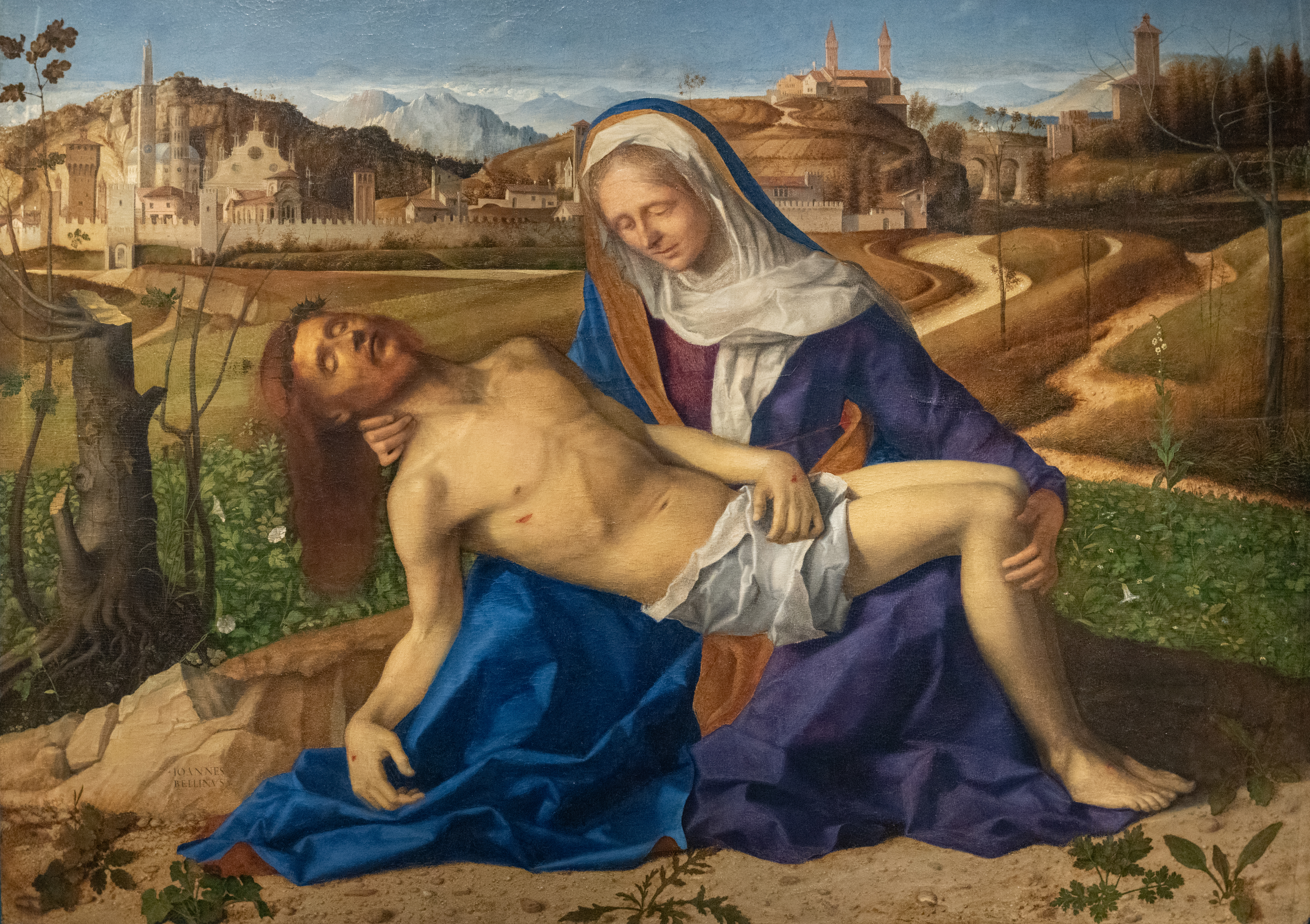
- Artist: Giovanni Bellini
- Year: circa 1505
- Medium: oil on panel
- Dimensions: 65 cm × 90 cm (26 in × 35 in)
- Location: Gallerie dell'Accademia, Venice

The Martinengo Pietà is an oil painting on panel of c. 1505 by the Italian Renaissance master Giovanni Bellini, signed on the rock to the left of the Virgin. It was previously in the collections of the Martinengo family and of Donà delle Rose and is now in the Gallerie dell'Accademia in Venice.

== History and description ==
One of Bellini's last works, it still shows him adapting to innovations by Titian and Giorgione and incorporating elements of the Vesperbild, the German variant on the pietà. Albrecht Dürer was in Venice at this time and the work's contorted hands and sharply defined drapery recall his work. It was the last pietà Bellini painted, around the same time as the San Zaccaria Altarpiece.

A lawn encloses the figures, suggesting the Marian symbol of the hortus conclusus. Behind it is a desert with a symbolic fig tree, as well as buildings based on the structures in Vicenza (the duomo, the Torre, the Basilica Palladiana), Ravenna (the bell tower of Sant'Apollinare) and Cividale (its Ponte del Diavolo, a bridge over the Natisone).

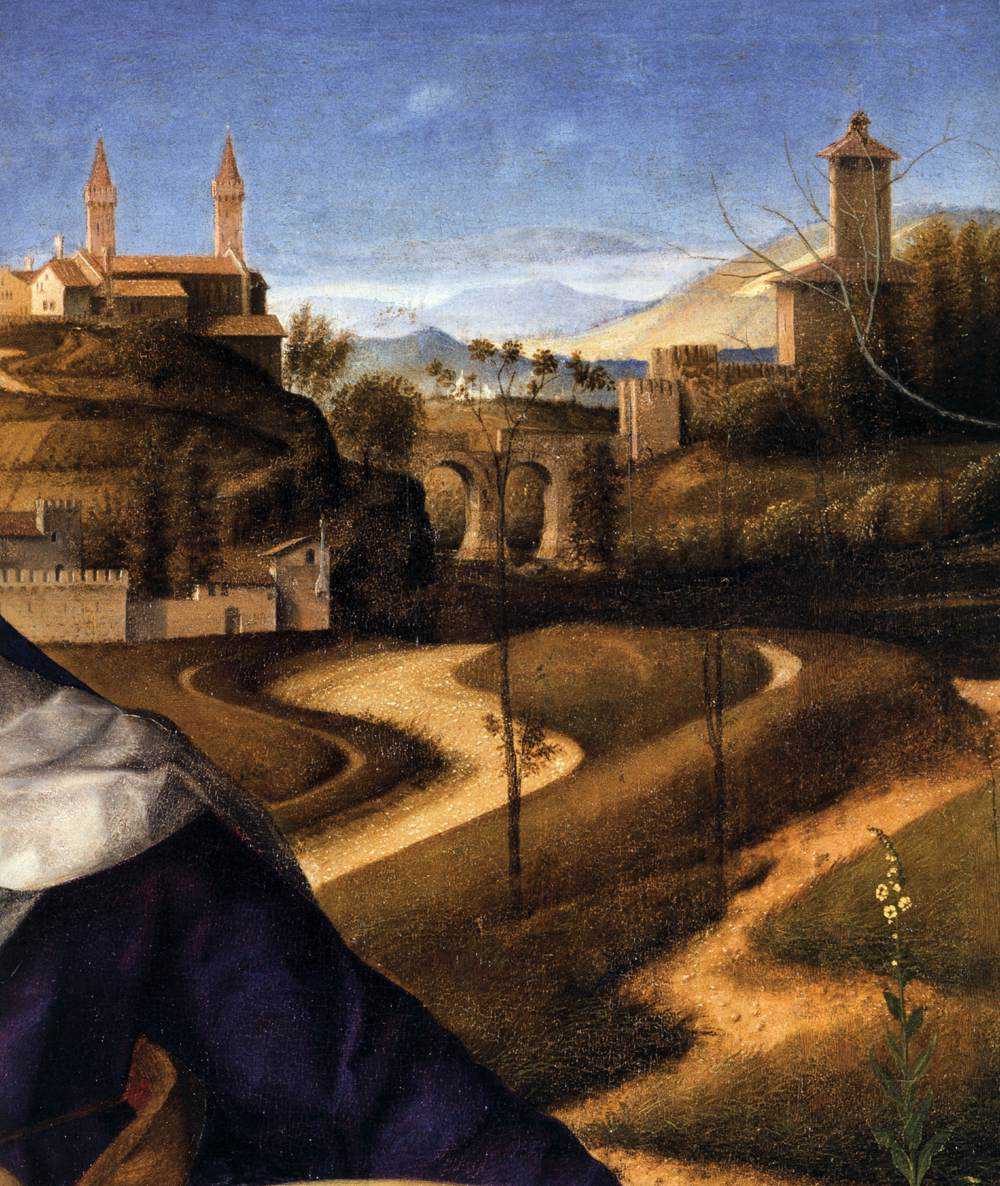
Detail

== See also ==
- List of works by Giovanni Bellini
