= Rocco Marconi =

Italian painter

Rocco Marconi, Christ and the Adulteress, c. 1525, Oil on canvas, 131 x 197 cm, Gallerie dell'Accademia, Venice

Rocco Marconi (born before 1490 – 13 May 1529) was an Italian painter of the Renaissance period, active mainly in Venice and Treviso. He was a pupil of the painter Giovanni Bellini along with Vittore Belliniano and Girolamo Santacroce. His first wife died in 1511. He is known to have joined the Venetian painters' guild (fraglia) in 1517, and the Scuola di Sant’Anna in 1526.
