= Gallerie dell'Accademia =

Art museum in Venice, Italy

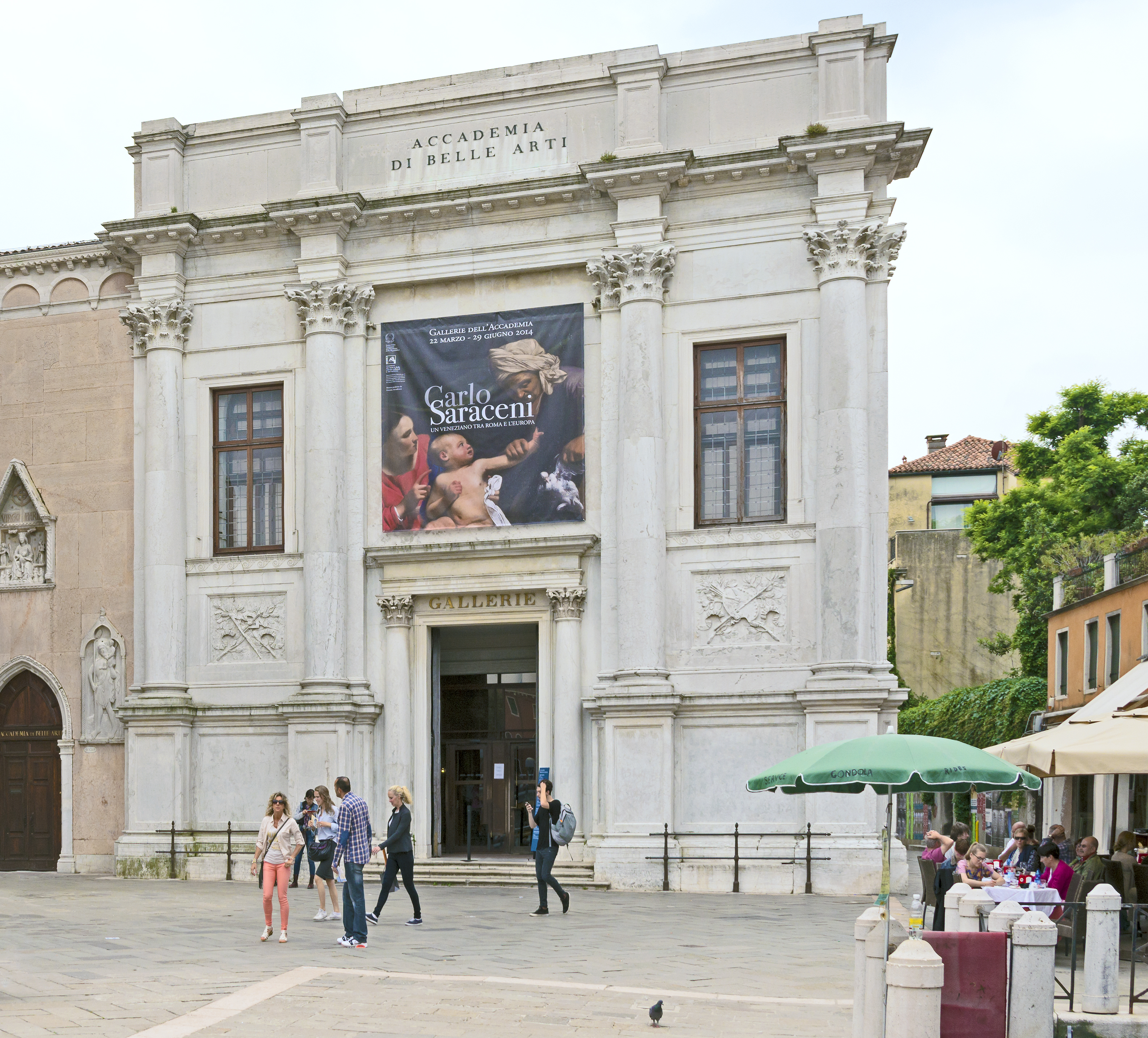
- Façade of the gallery on Campo della Carità
- Click the map for an interactive, fullscreen view.
- Former names: Veneta Academia di Pittura, Scultura e Architettura; Accademia Reale di Belle Arti
- Established: 1750 (276 years ago)
- Location: Campo della Carità, Dorsoduro 1050, Venice, Italy
- Coordinates: 45°25′53″N 12°19′41″E
- Type: Art museum
- Director: Giulio Manieri Elia
- Curators: Roberta Battaglia; Isabella Collavizza; Rosella Lauber; Michele Nicolaci; Valeria Poletto; Silvia Salvini
- Public transit access: vaporetto
- Website: gallerieaccademia.it

The Gallerie dell'Accademia is a museum gallery of pre-19th-century art in Venice, northern Italy. It houses the Leonardo da Vinci drawing The Vitruvian Man, which can only be exposed for a few weeks every six years for conservation reasons. It is housed in a building complex comprising the former Scuola Grande, church, and convent of Santa Maria della Carità on the south bank of the Grand Canal, within the sestiere of Dorsoduro.

It was originally the gallery of the Accademia di Belle Arti di Venezia, the art academy of Venice, from which it became independent in 1879, and for which the Ponte dell'Accademia and the Accademia boat landing station for the vaporetto water bus are named. The two institutions remained in the same building until 2004, when the art school moved to the Ospedale degli Incurabili.

== History ==
=== Early history ===
The Accademia di Belle Arti di Venezia was founded on 24 September 1750; the statute dates from 1756. The first director was Giovanni Battista Piazzetta; Gianbattista Tiepolo became the first president after his return from Würzburg.

It was one of the first institutions to study art restoration starting in 1777 with Pietro Edwards, and formalised by 1819 as a course.

In 1807 the academy was re-founded by Napoleonic decree. The name was changed from Veneta Academia di Pittura, Scultura e Architettura to Accademia Reale di Belle Arti, "royal academy of fine arts", and the academy was moved to the Palladian complex of the Scuola della Carità, where the Gallerie dell'Accademia are still housed. The collections of the Accademia were first opened to the public on 10 August 1817.

=== Later history ===
The Gallerie dell'Accademia became independent from the Accademia di Belle Arti di Venezia in 1879. Like other state museums in Italy, it falls under the Ministero per i Beni e le Attività Culturali, the Italian Ministry of Culture and Heritage.

== Building ==
The Napoleonic administration had disbanded many institutions in Venice including some churches, convents and Scuole. The Scuola della Carità, the Convento dei Canonici Lateranensi and the church of Santa Maria della Carità thus became the home of the Accademia. The Scuola della Carità was the oldest of the six Scuole Grandi and the building dates back to 1343, though the scuola was formed in 1260. The Convento dei Canonici Lateranensi was started in 1561 by Andrea Palladio, though it was never fully completed. The facade of Santa Maria della Carità was completed in 1441 by Bartolomeo Bon.

== Collection ==
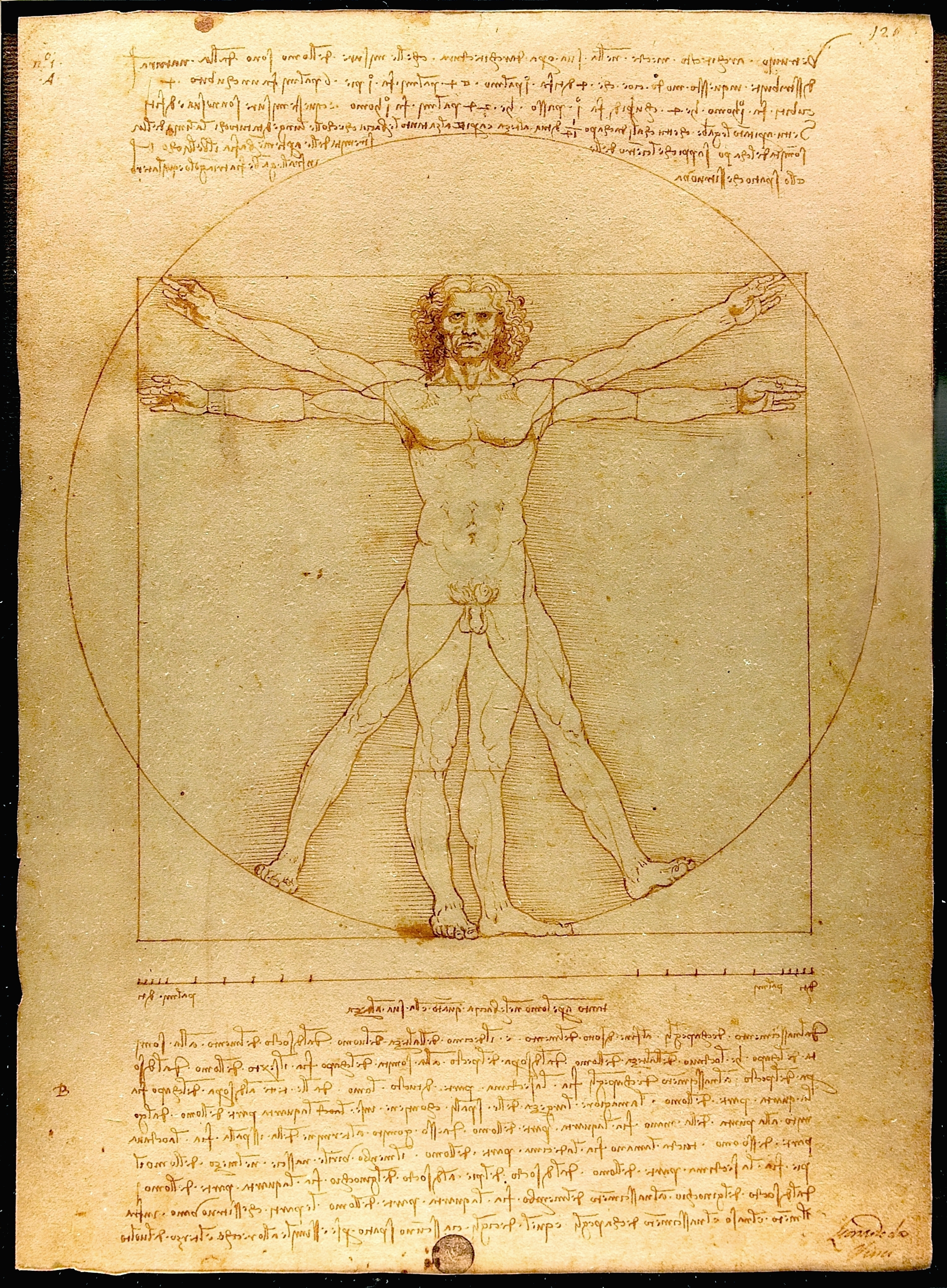
Leonardo da Vinci's Vitruvian Man, the most famous work of the Gallery, is not displayed for visitors, except on very rare occasions.

The Gallerie dell’Accademia contains masterpieces of Venetian painting up to the 19th century, generally arranged chronologically though some thematic displays are evident.

Artists represented include: Giovanni d'Alemagna, Jacopo and Leandro Bassano, Lazzaro Bastiani, Jacopo, Gentile and Giovanni Bellini, Bernardo Bellotto, Paris Bordone, Hieronymus Bosch, Canaletto, Antonio Canova, Vittore Carpaccio, Giulio Carpioni, Rosalba Carriera, Cima da Conegliano, Pietro da Cortona, Domenico Fetti, Jacobello del Fiore, Fra Galgario, Pietro Gaspari, Luca Giordano, Giovanni Antonio and Francesco Guardi, Giorgione, Francesco Hayez, Giulia Lama, Charles Le Brun, Johann Liss, Leonardo da Vinci, Pietro and Alessandro Longhi, Lorenzo Veneziano, Johann Carl Loth, Lorenzo Lotto, Francesco Maffei, Giovanni Mansueti, Andrea Mantegna, Rocco Marconi, Michele Marieschi, Hans Memling, Michele di Matteo da Bologna, Palma Vecchio and Giovane, Paolo Veneziano, Giovanni Battista Piazzetta, Piero della Francesca, Bonifacio de' Pitati, Giambattista Pittoni, Mattia Preti, Sebastiano and Marco Ricci, Benedetto Rusconi, Carlo Saraceni, Giovanni Battista and Giovanni Domenico Tiepolo, Jacopo and Domenico Tintoretto, Titian, Cosmè Tura, Paolo Veronese, Giorgio Vasari, Antonio, Bartolomeo and Alvise Vivarini, Giuseppe Zais, Francesco Zuccarelli.

The collection includes Leonardo da Vinci's drawing of the Vitruvian Man, which is displayed only rarely as the work, being on paper, is fragile and sensitive to light. In 2019, the Louvre in Paris requested the loan of the drawing for its exhibition of works by Leonardo. The request was refused by a cultural heritage group. A court tribunal in Venice, however, decided that the work would suffer no ill effects if shipped with great care and displayed under controlled conditions. The work was, therefore, part of the Louvre's exhibition from 24 October 2019 to 24 February 2020.

=== Highlights ===
Hieronymus Bosch
The Hermit Saints, 86 × 120 cm

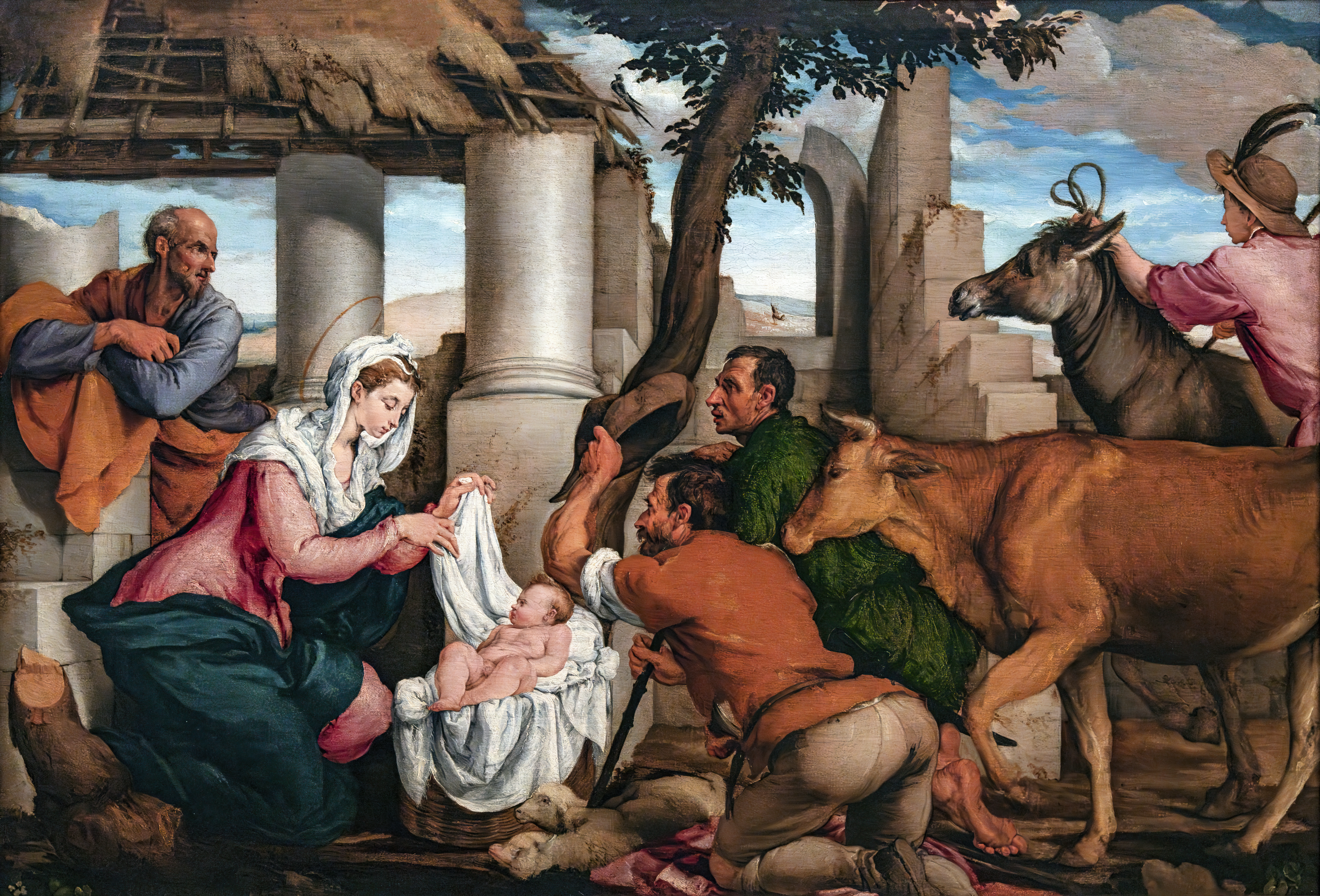
Jacopo Bassano
Adoration of the Shepherds, 9 × 142 cm

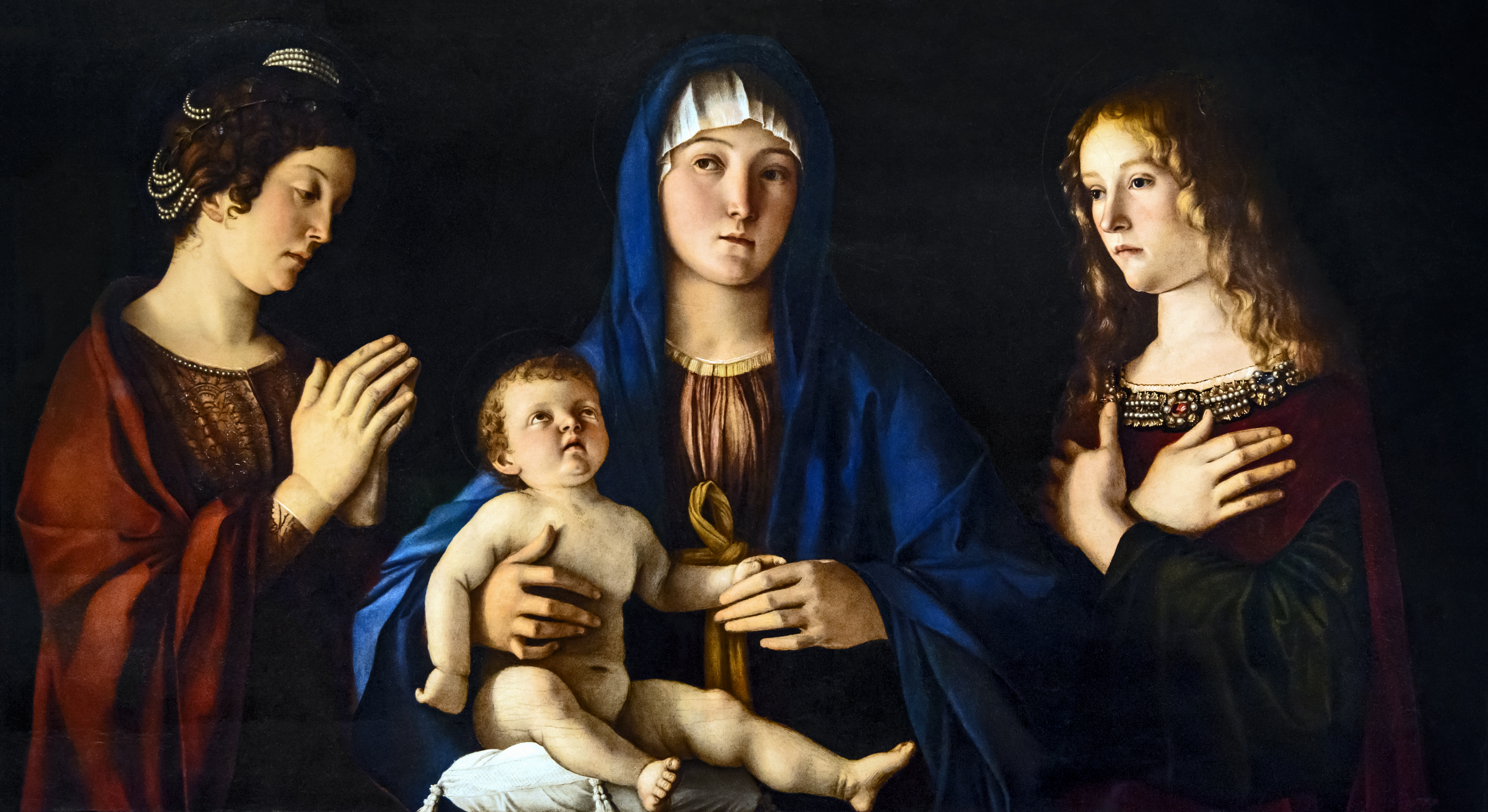
Giovanni Bellini
Madonna and Child with Saint Catherine and Saint Mary Magdalene, 58 × 107 cm

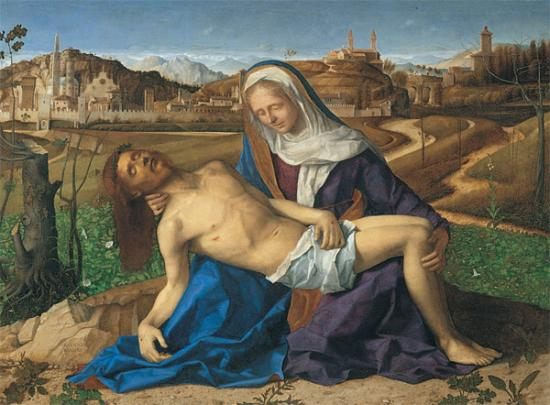
Giovanni Bellini
Martinengo Pietà, 65 × 90 cm

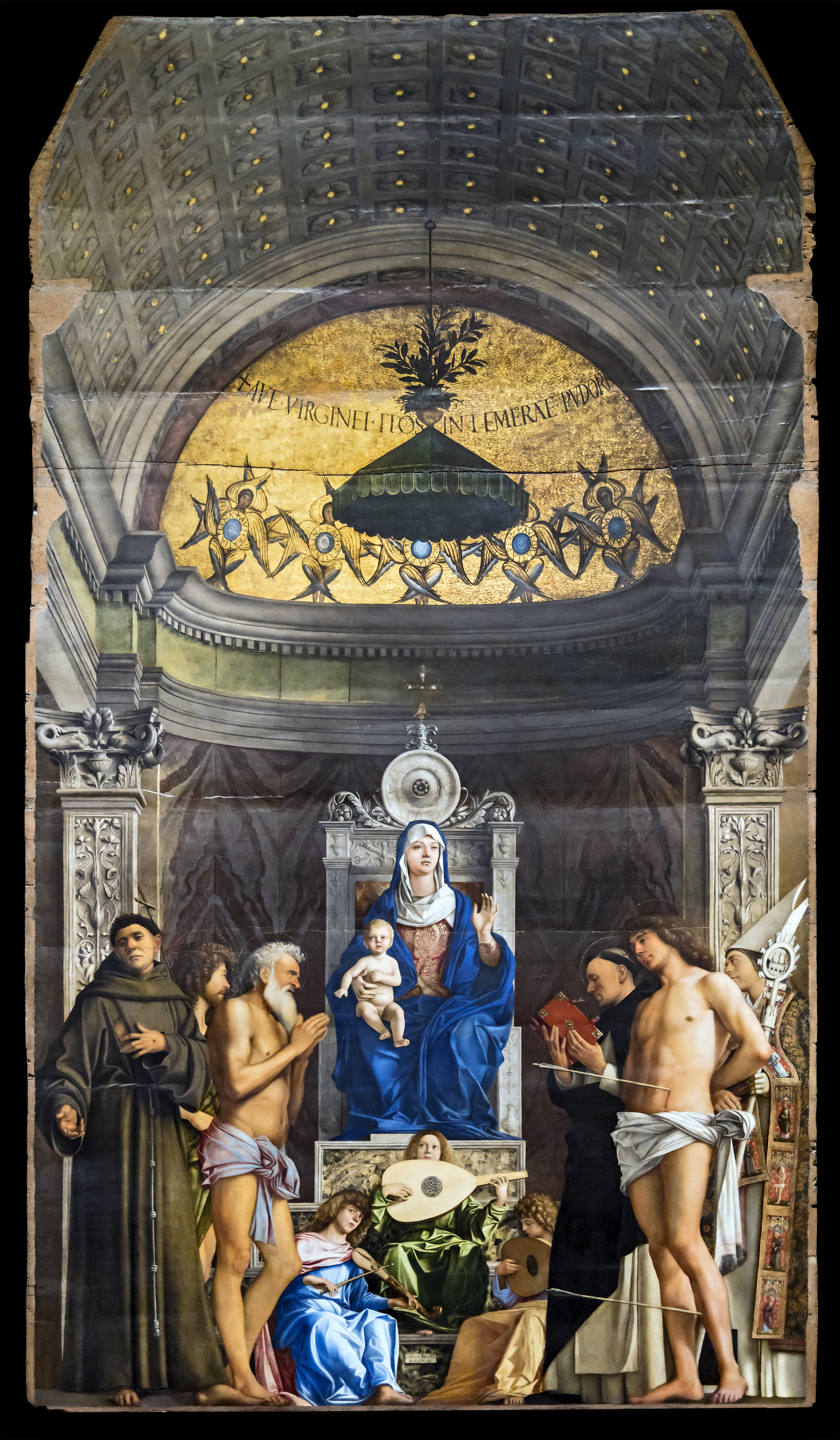
Giovanni Bellini
San Giobbe Altarpiece, 371 × 258 cm

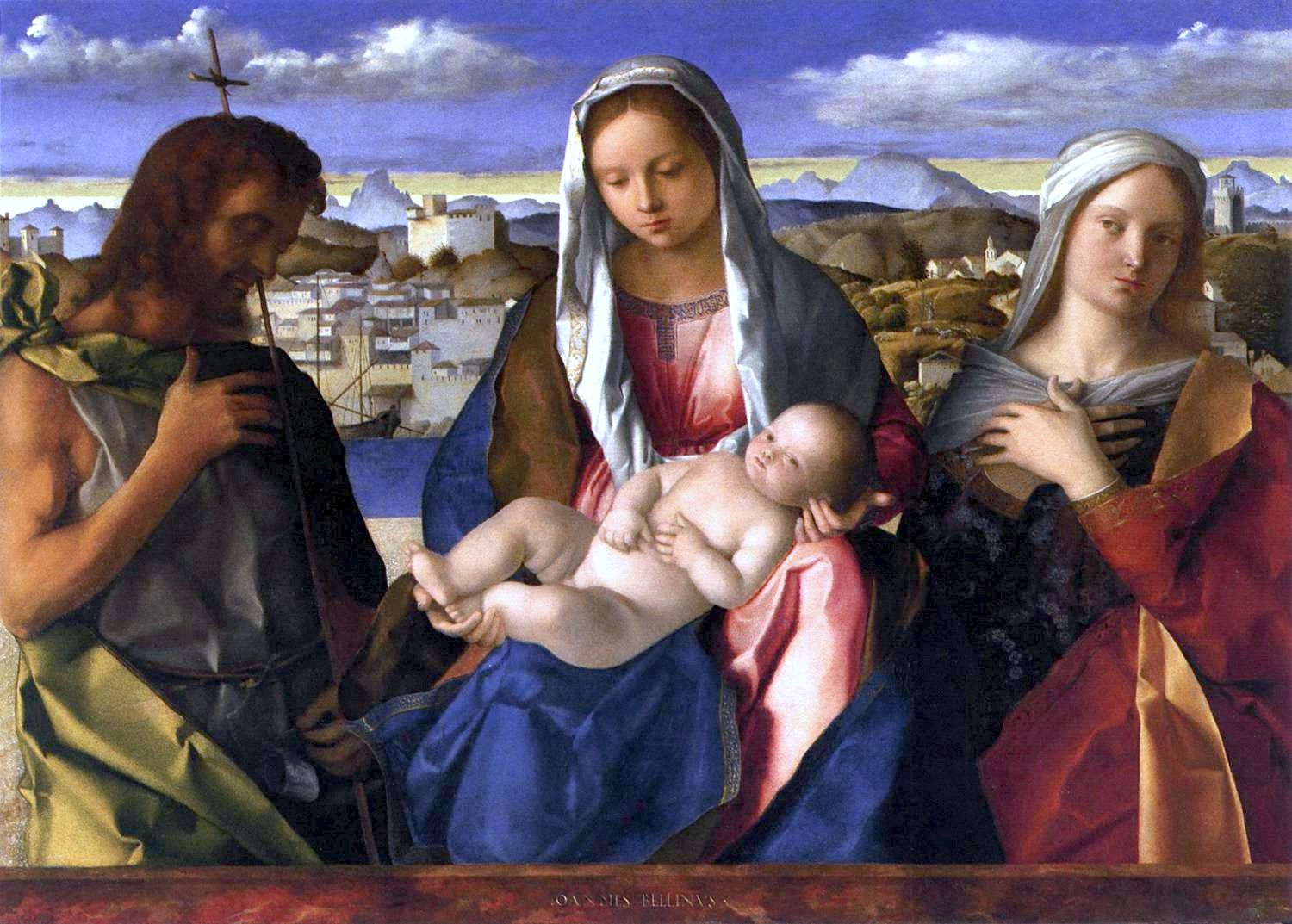
Giovanni Bellini
Sacred Conversation, 54 × 76 cm

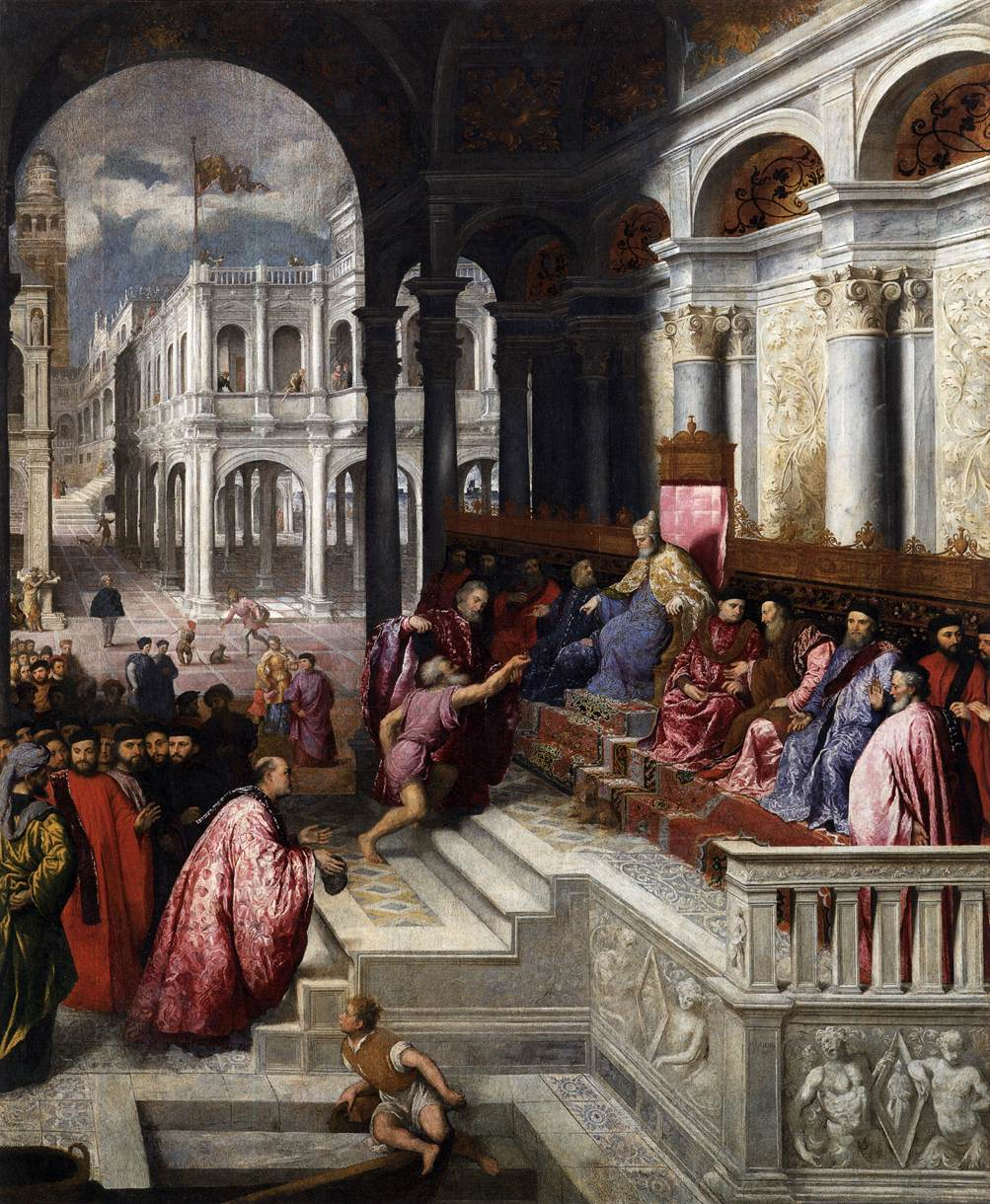
Paris Bordone
The Presentation of the Ring, 370 × 301 cm

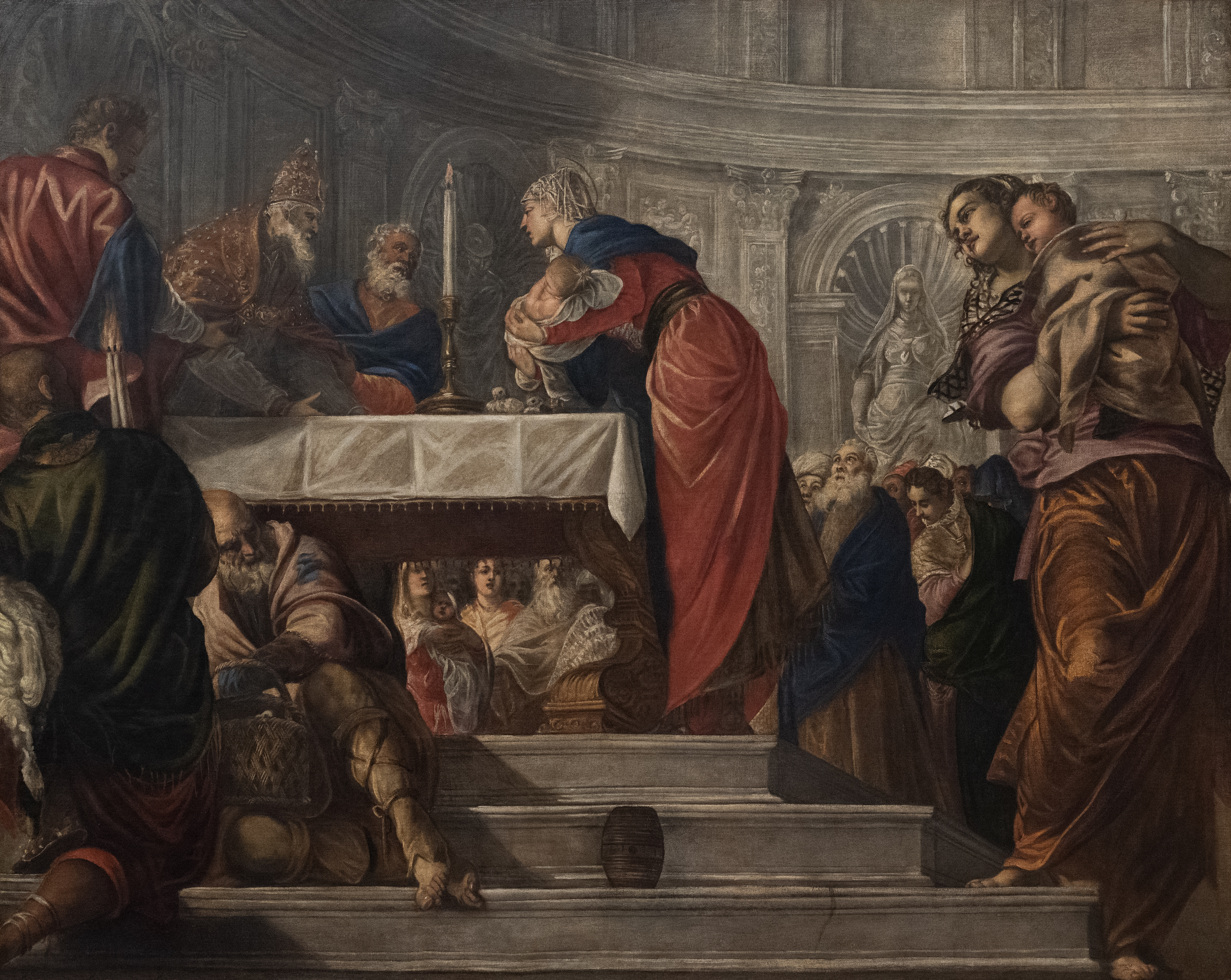
Tintoretto, Presentation at the Temple

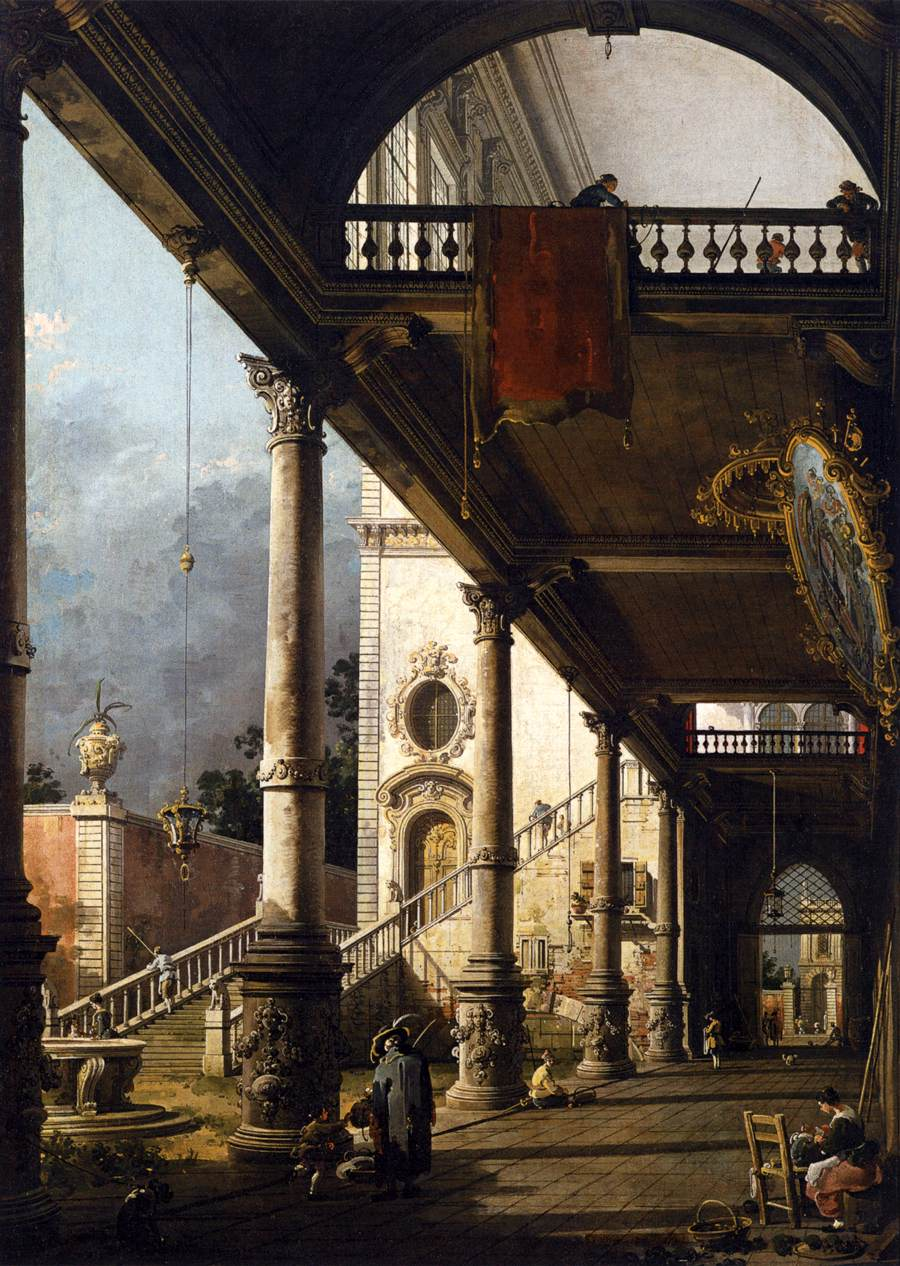
Canaletto
Perspective View with Portico, 131 × 93 cm

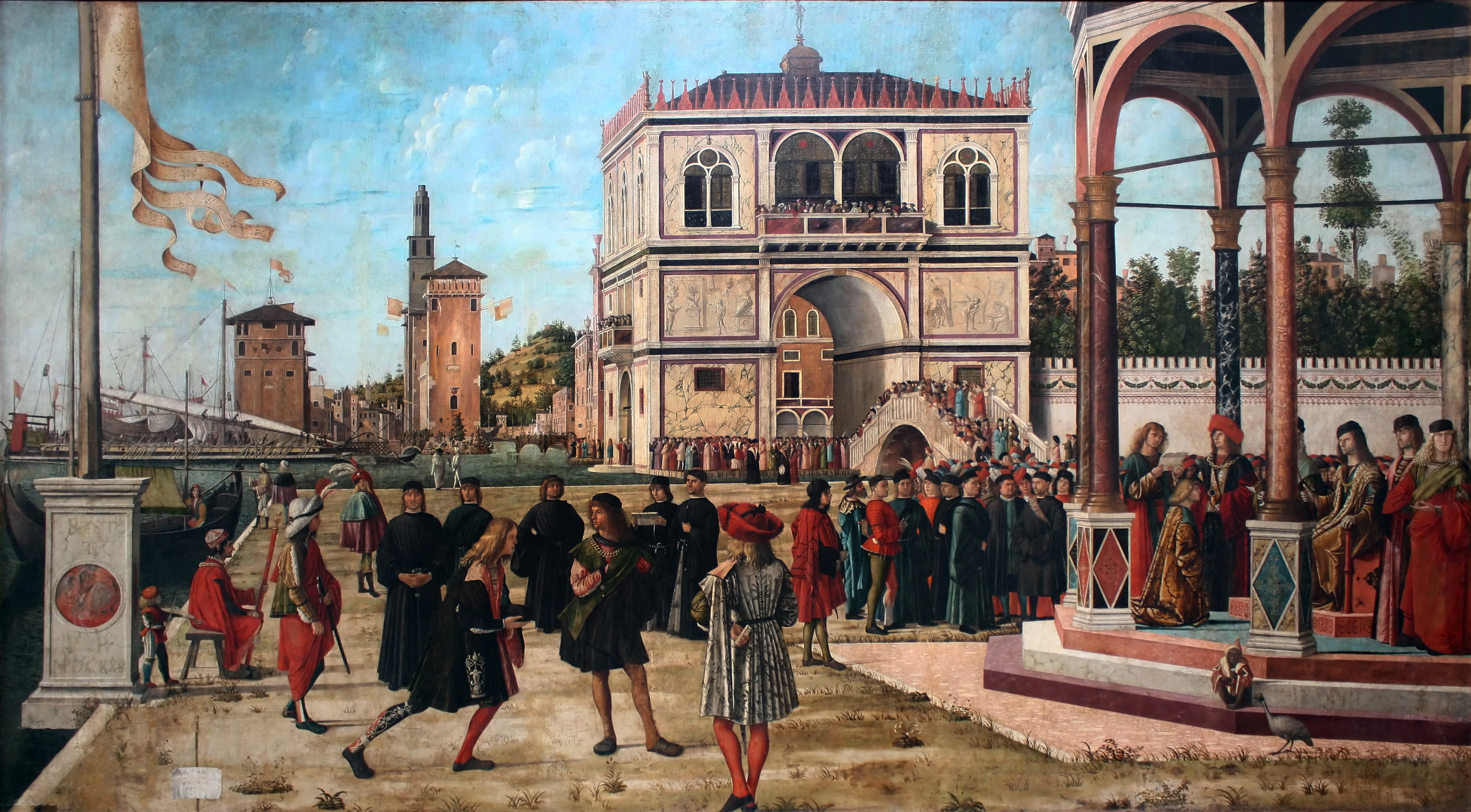
Vittore Carpaccio
Cycle of St. Ursula, 297 × 527 cm

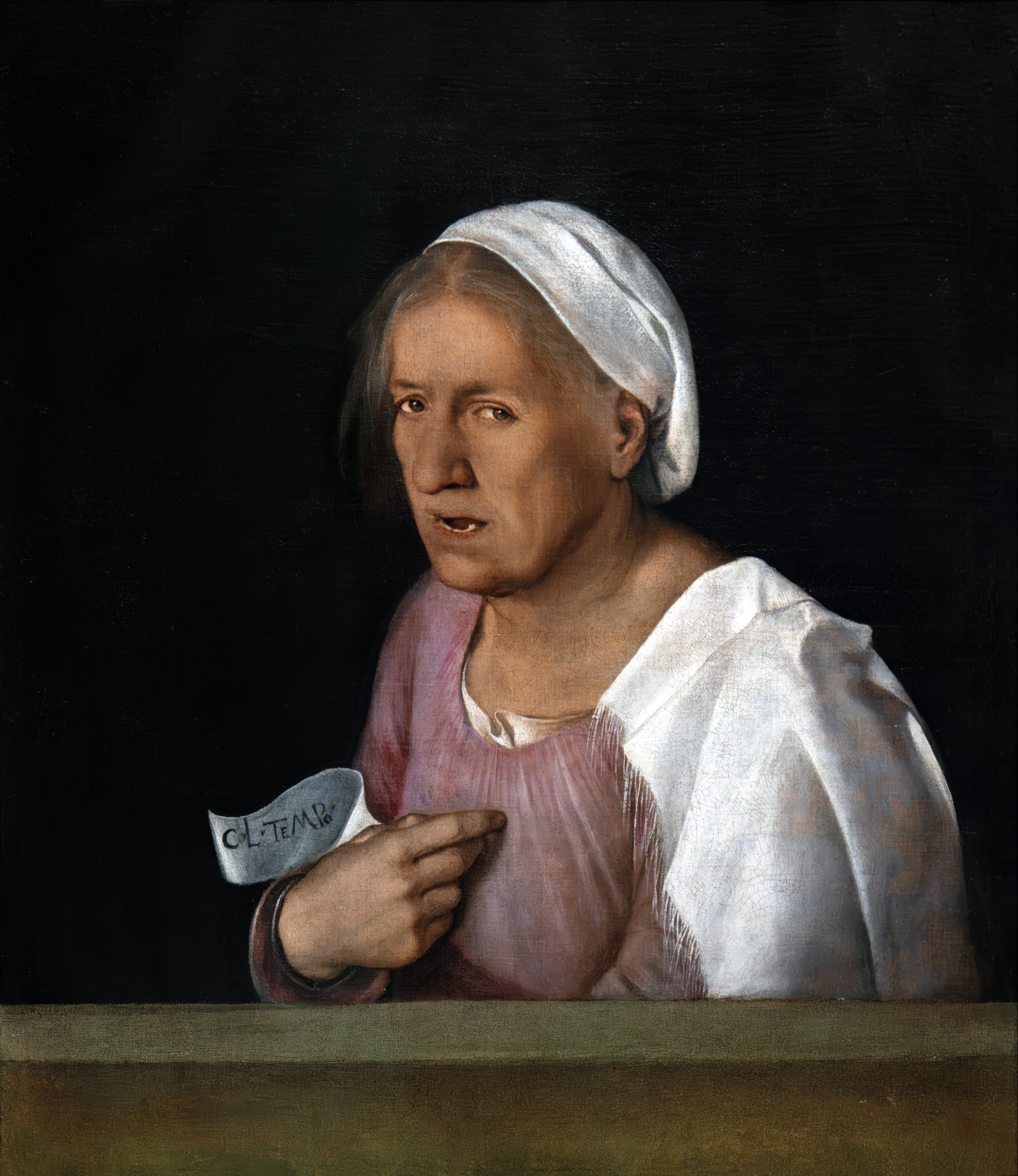
Giorgione
Old Woman, 68 × 59 cm

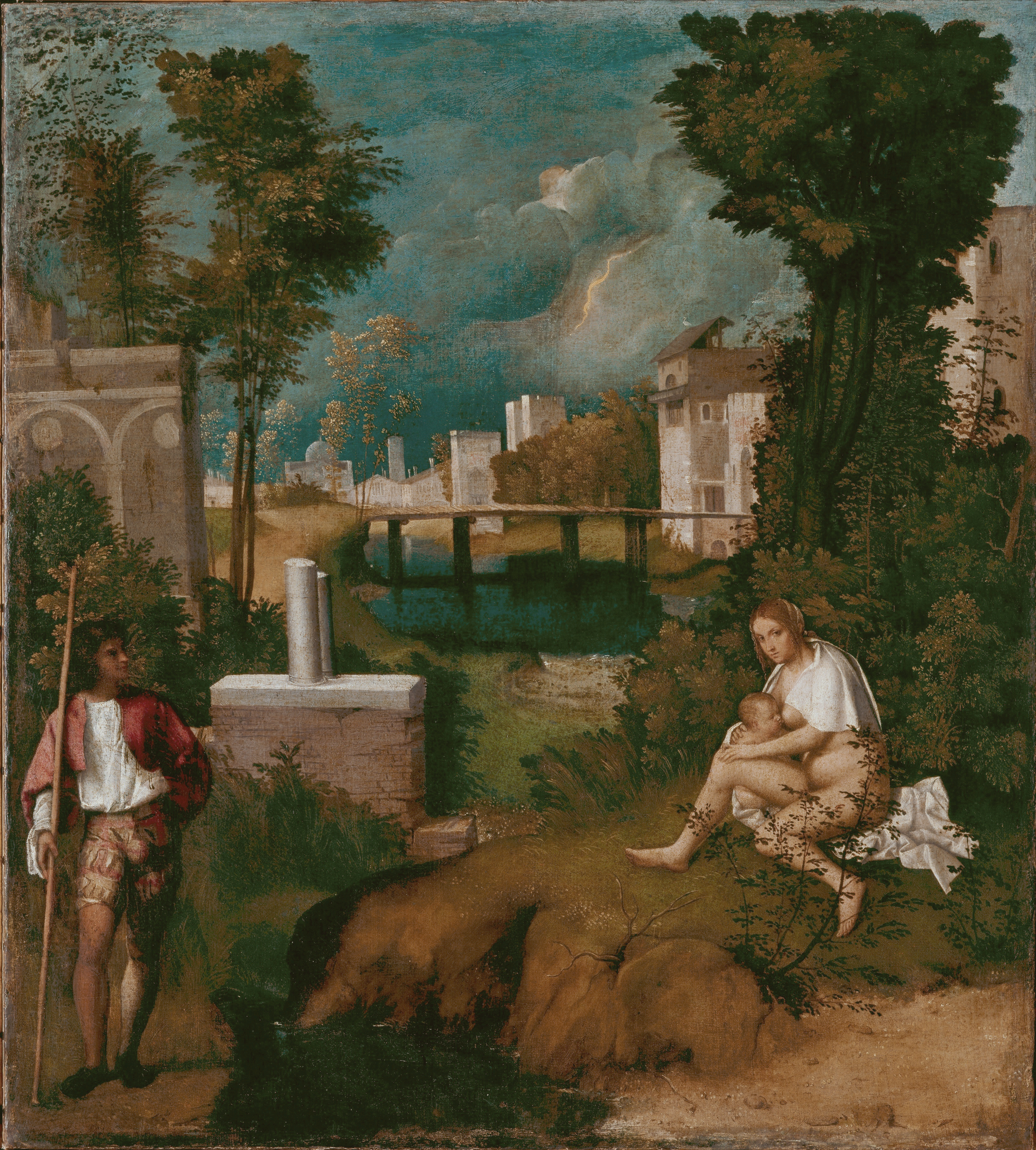
Giorgione
The Tempest, 82 × 73 cm

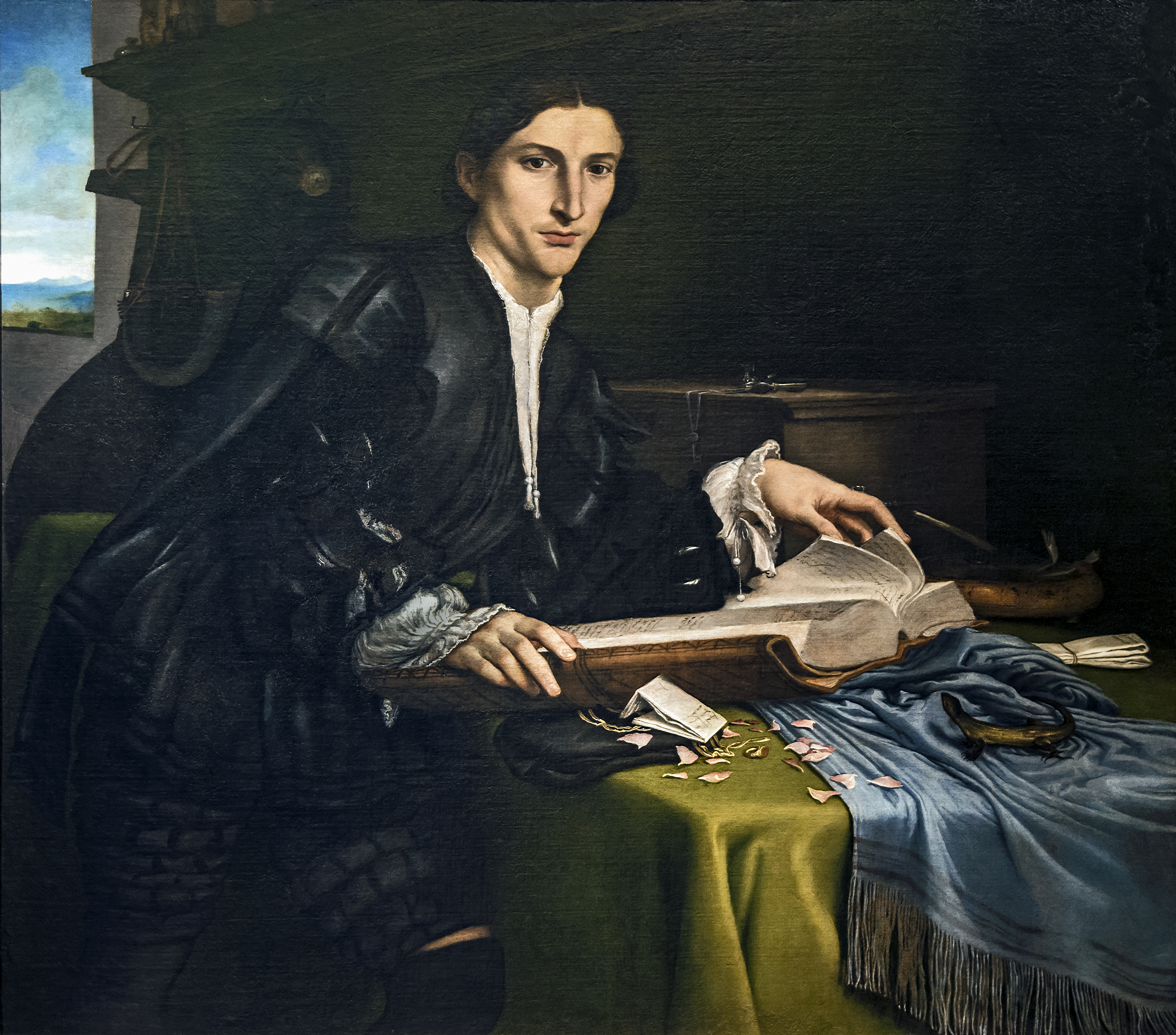
Lorenzo Lotto
Gentleman in His Study, 98 × 116 cm

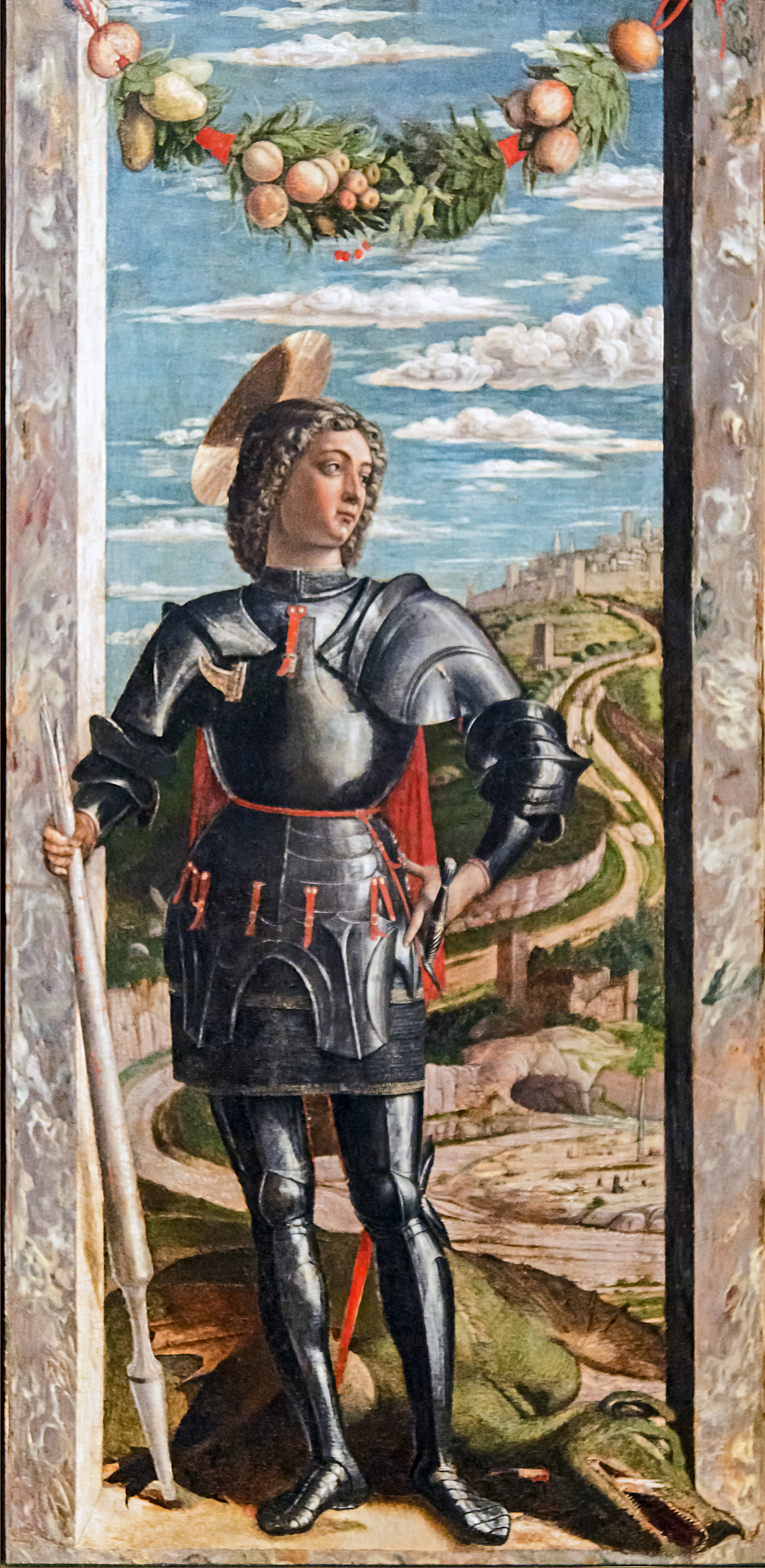
Andrea Mantegna
St. George, 66 × 32 cm

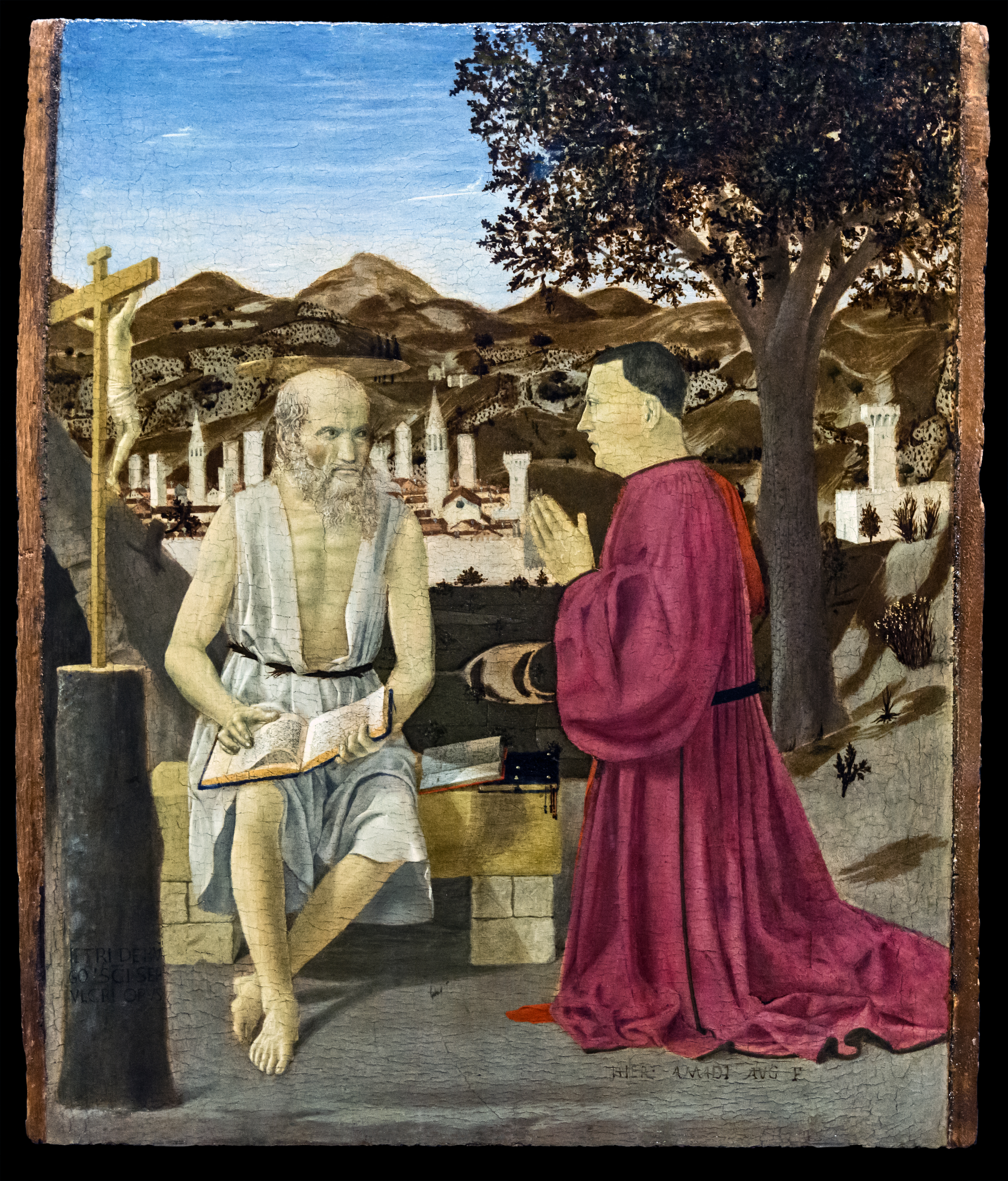
Piero della Francesca
St. Jerome and Donor, 49 × 42 cm

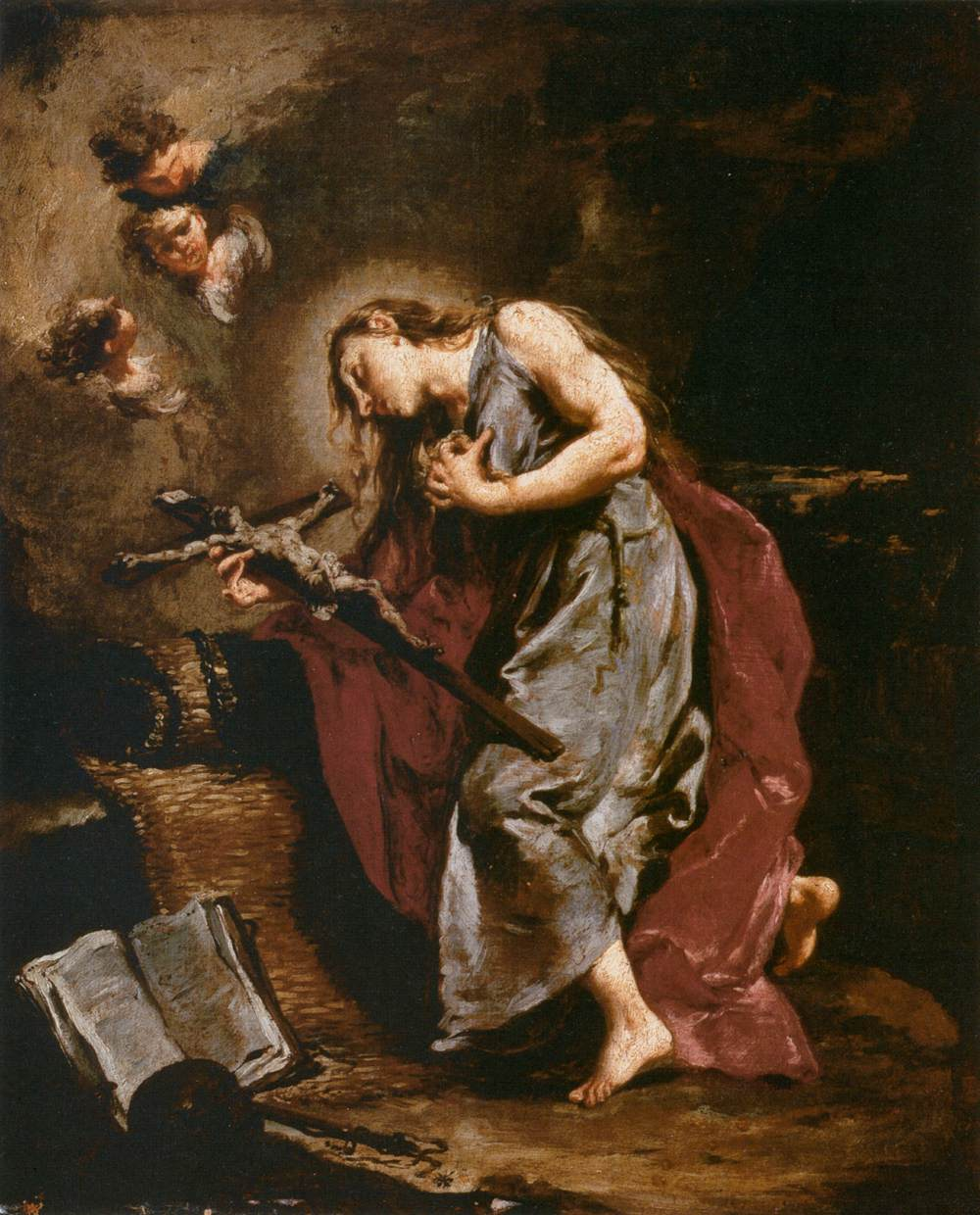
Giambattista Pittoni
Penitent Magdalene, 48 × 38 cm

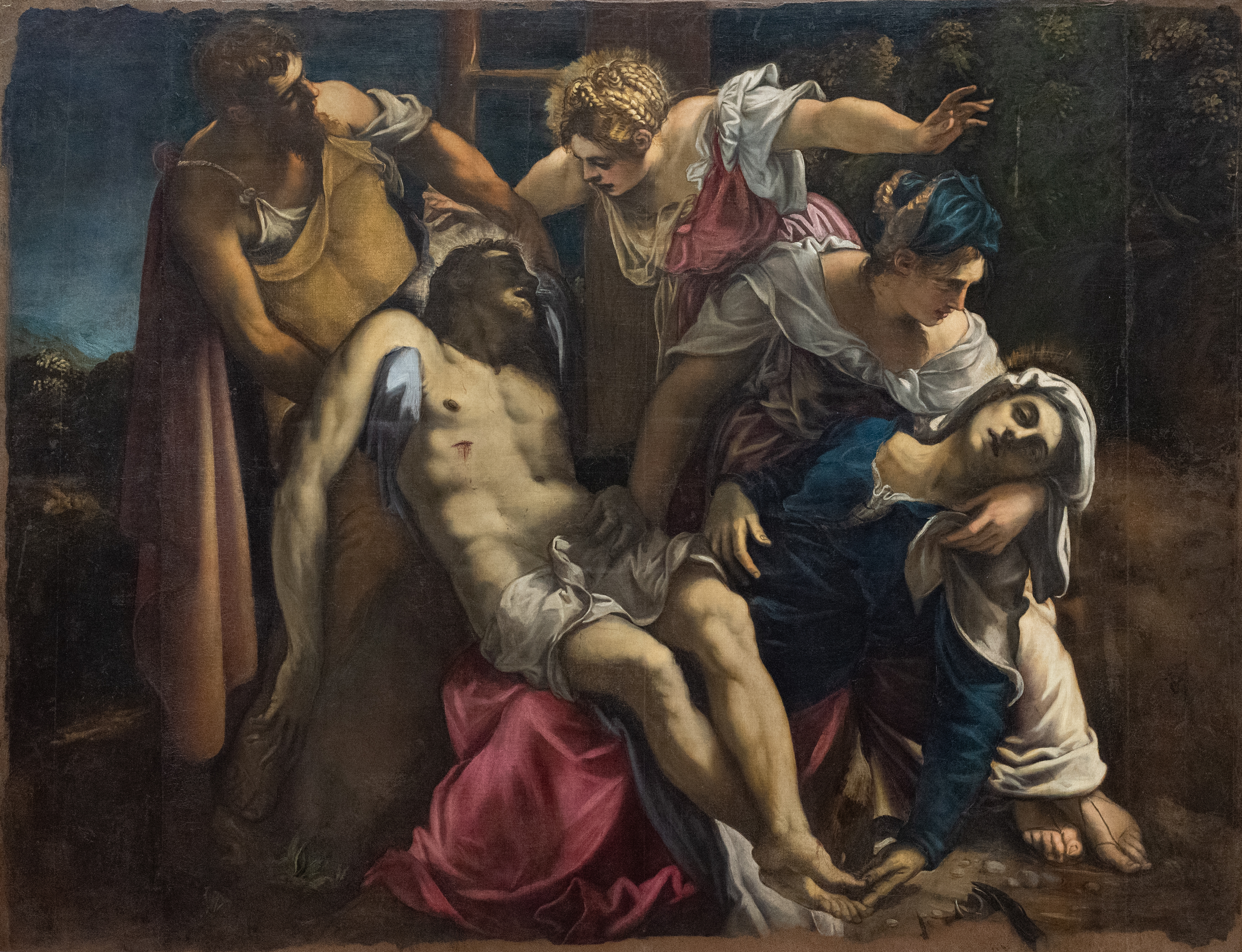
Tintoretto
Lamentation, 227 × 294 cm

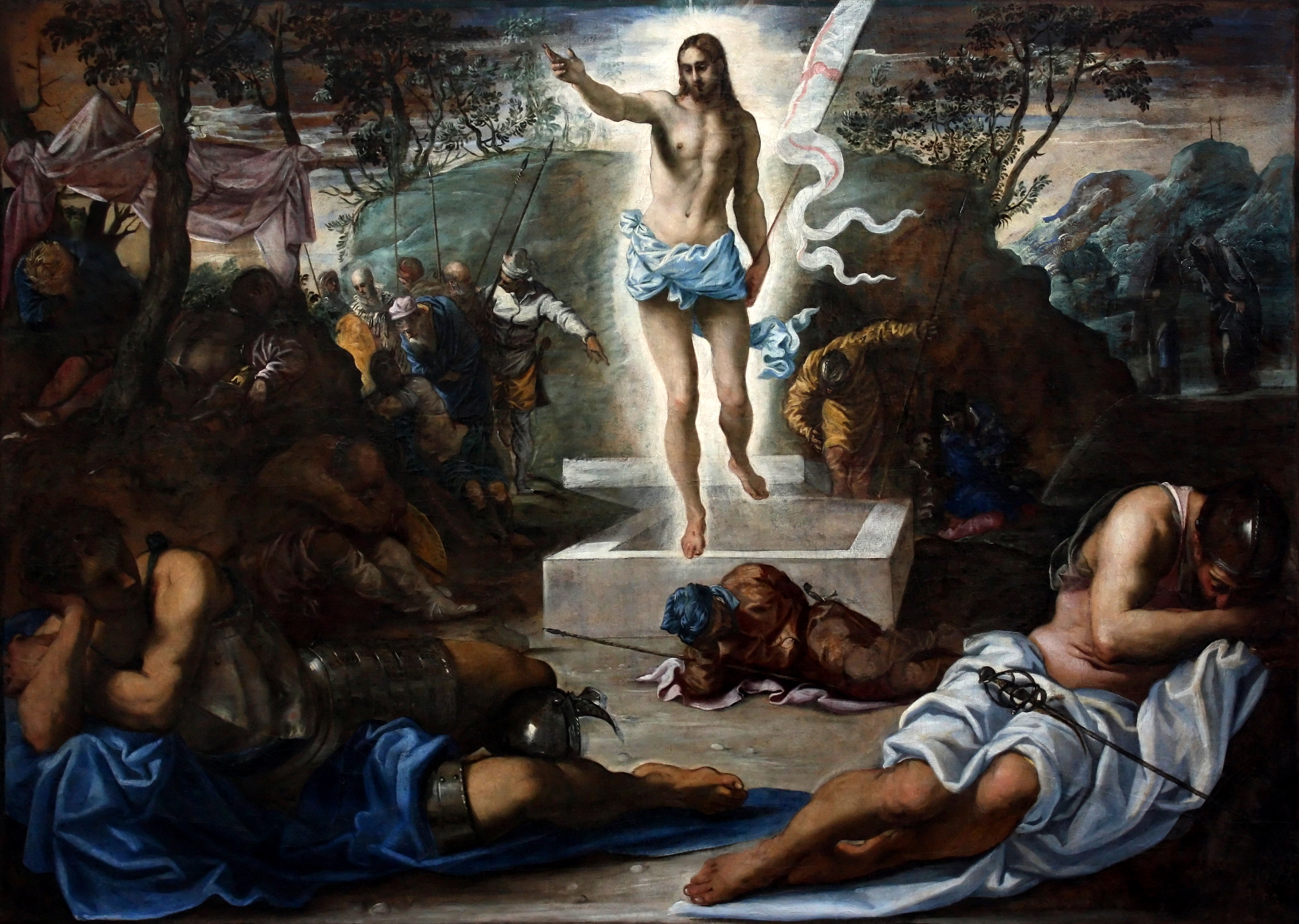
Tintoretto
Resurrection

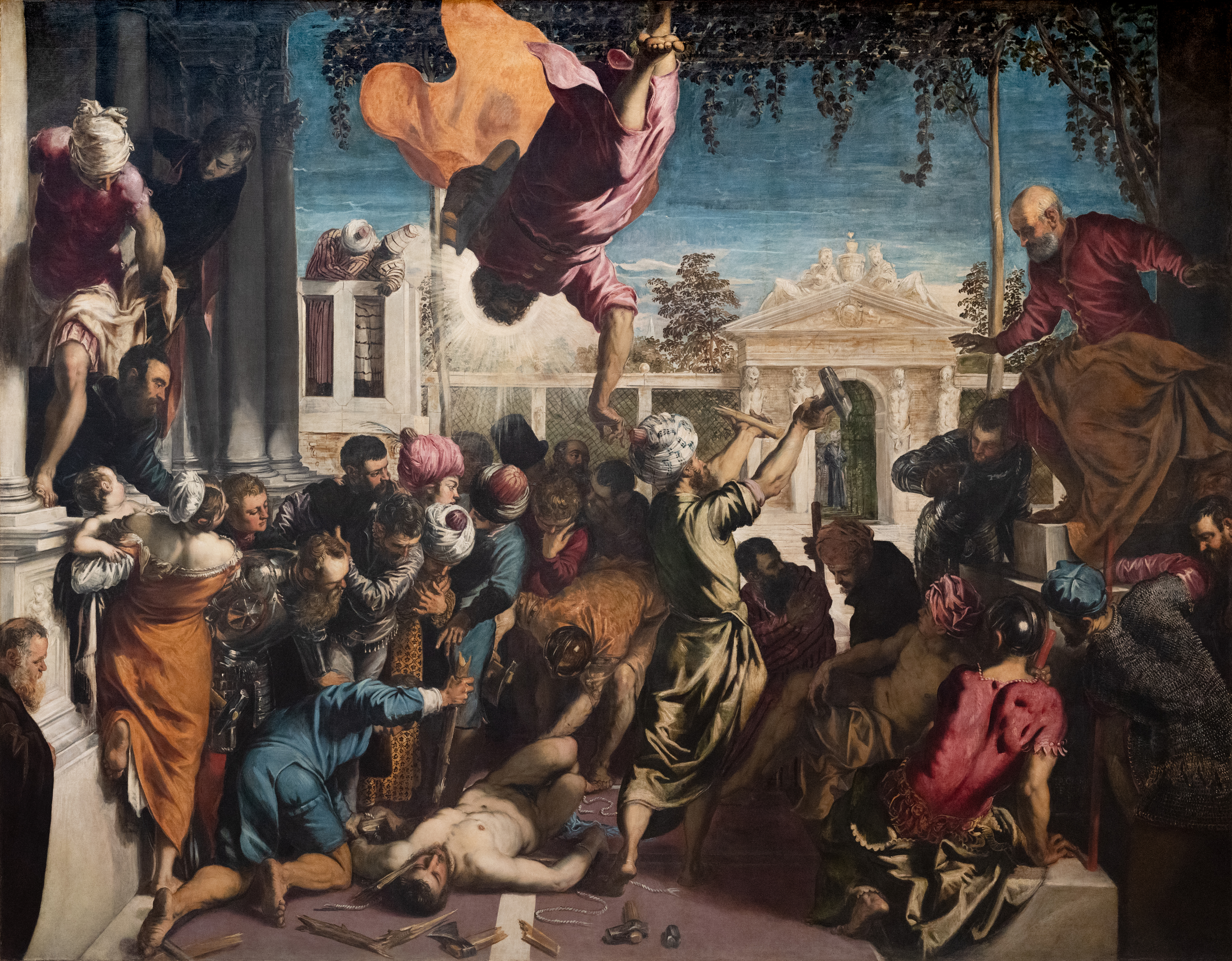
Tintoretto
Miracle of the Slave, 415 × 541 cm

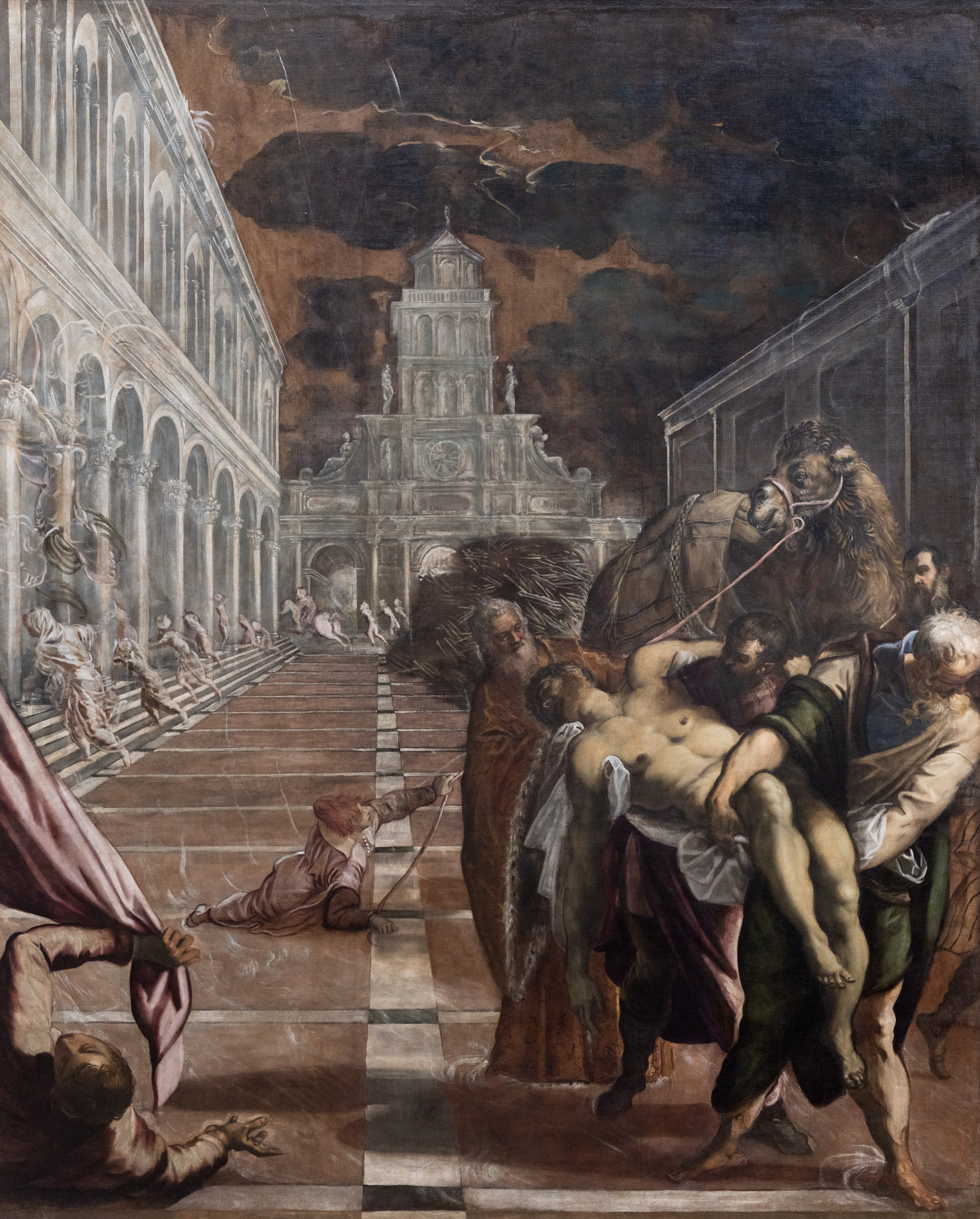
Tintoretto
Saint Mark's Body Brought to Venice, 421 × 306 cm

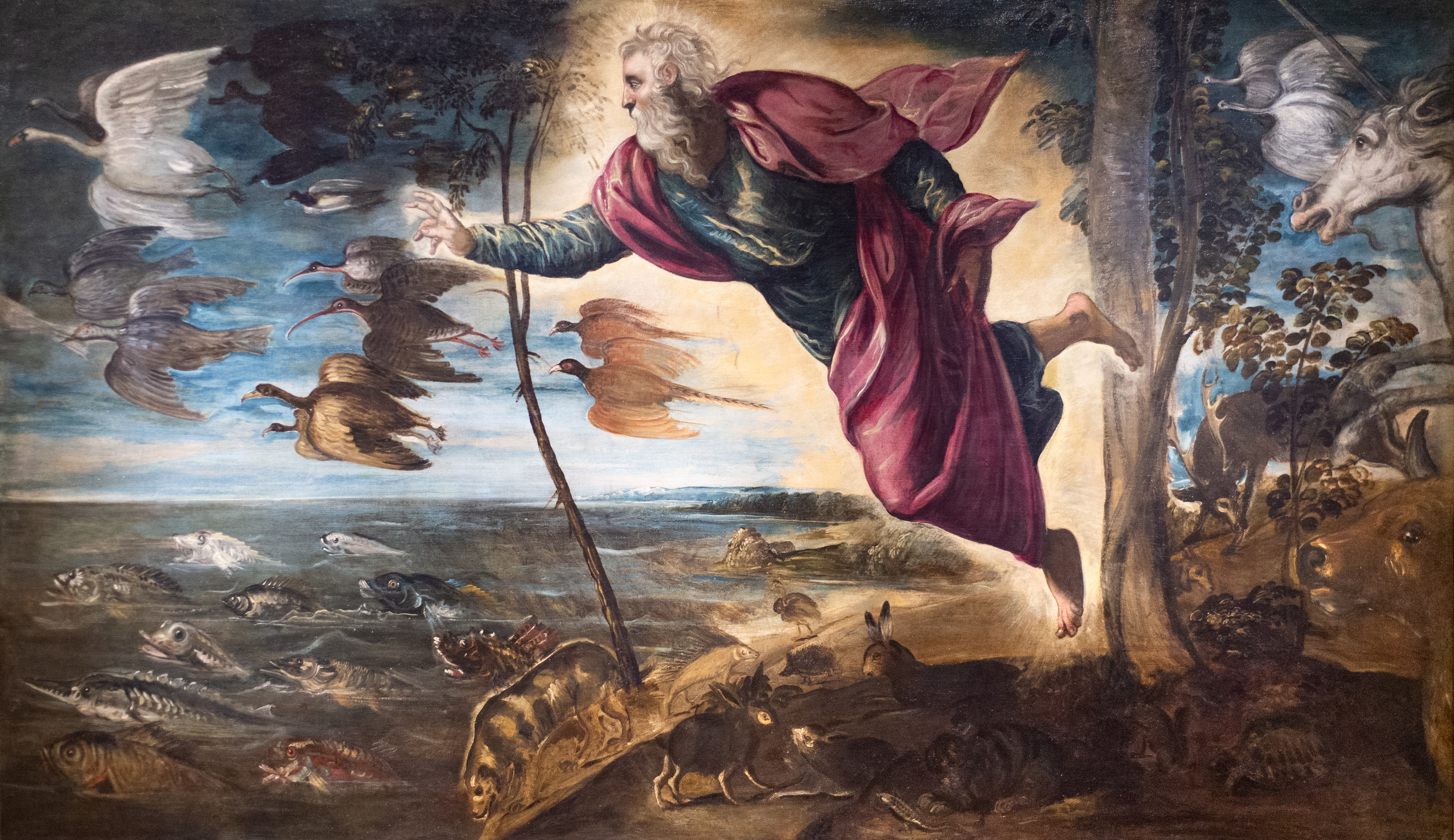
Tintoretto
Creation of the Animals, 151 × 258 cm

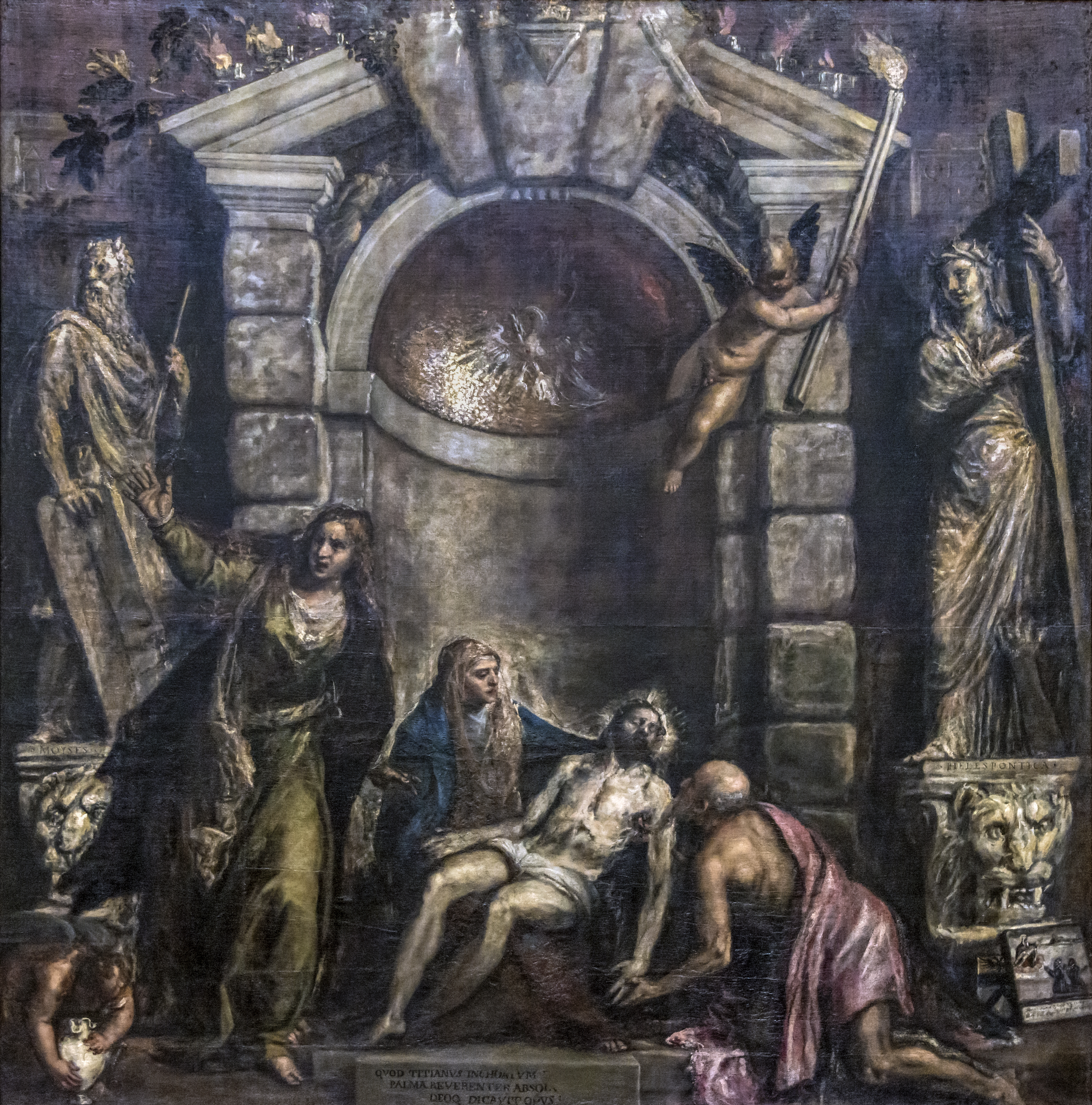
Titian
Pietà, 353 × 348 cm

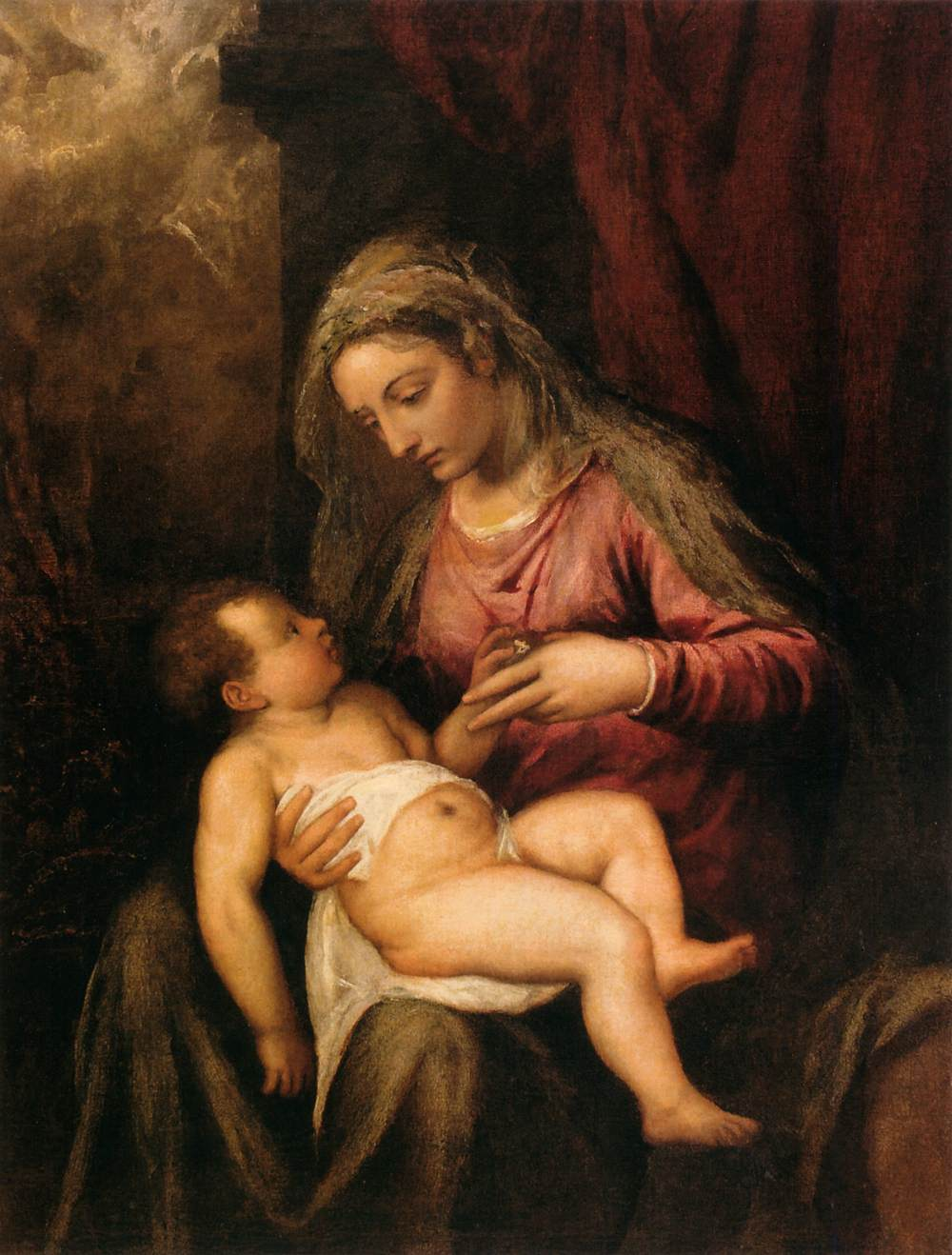
Titian
Virgin and Child, 124 × 96 cm

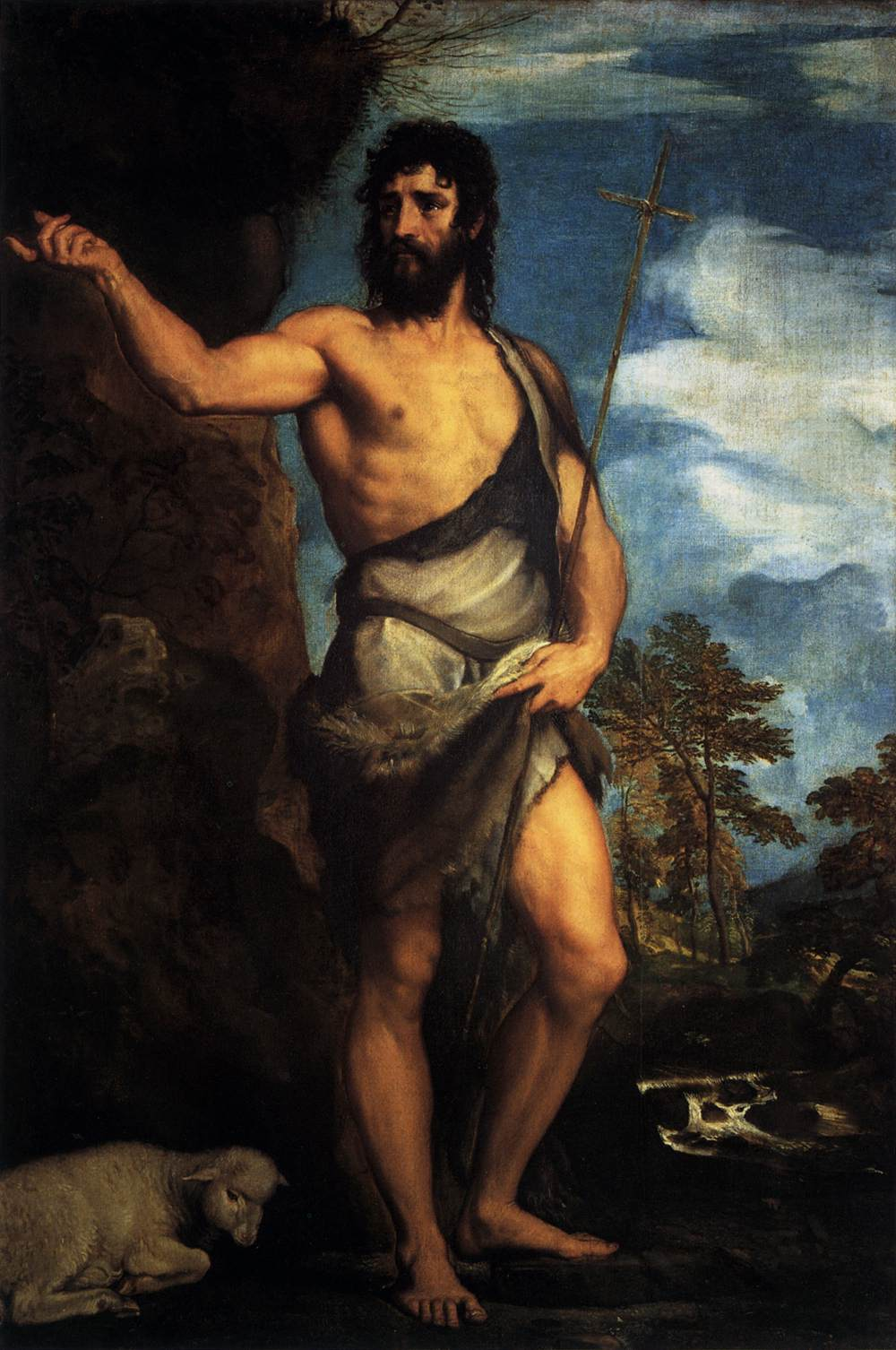
Titian. Saint John the Baptist, 201 × 134 cm

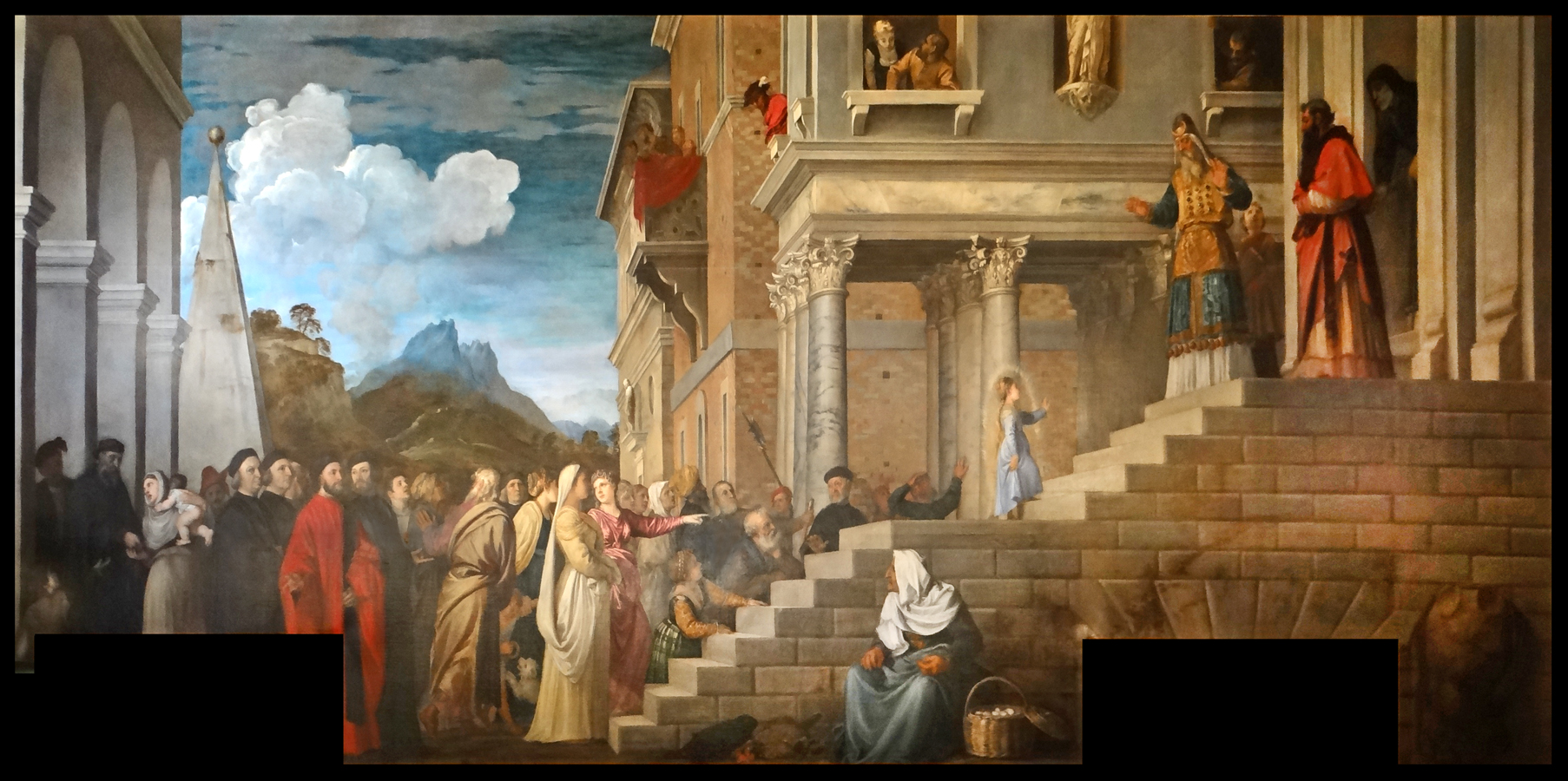
Titian
The Presentation of the Virgin, 345 × 775 cm

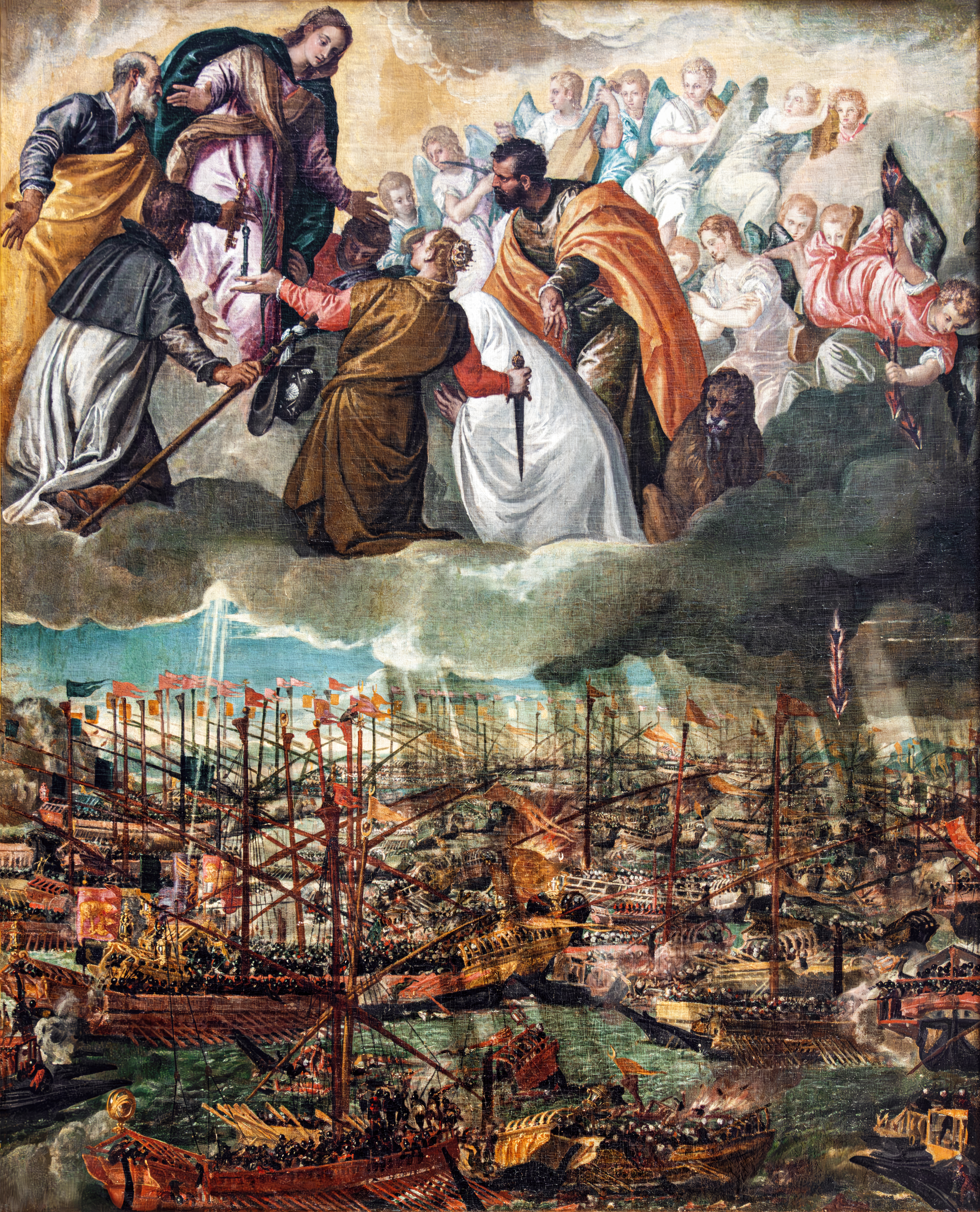
Paolo Veronese
Battle of Lepanto, 169 × 137 cm

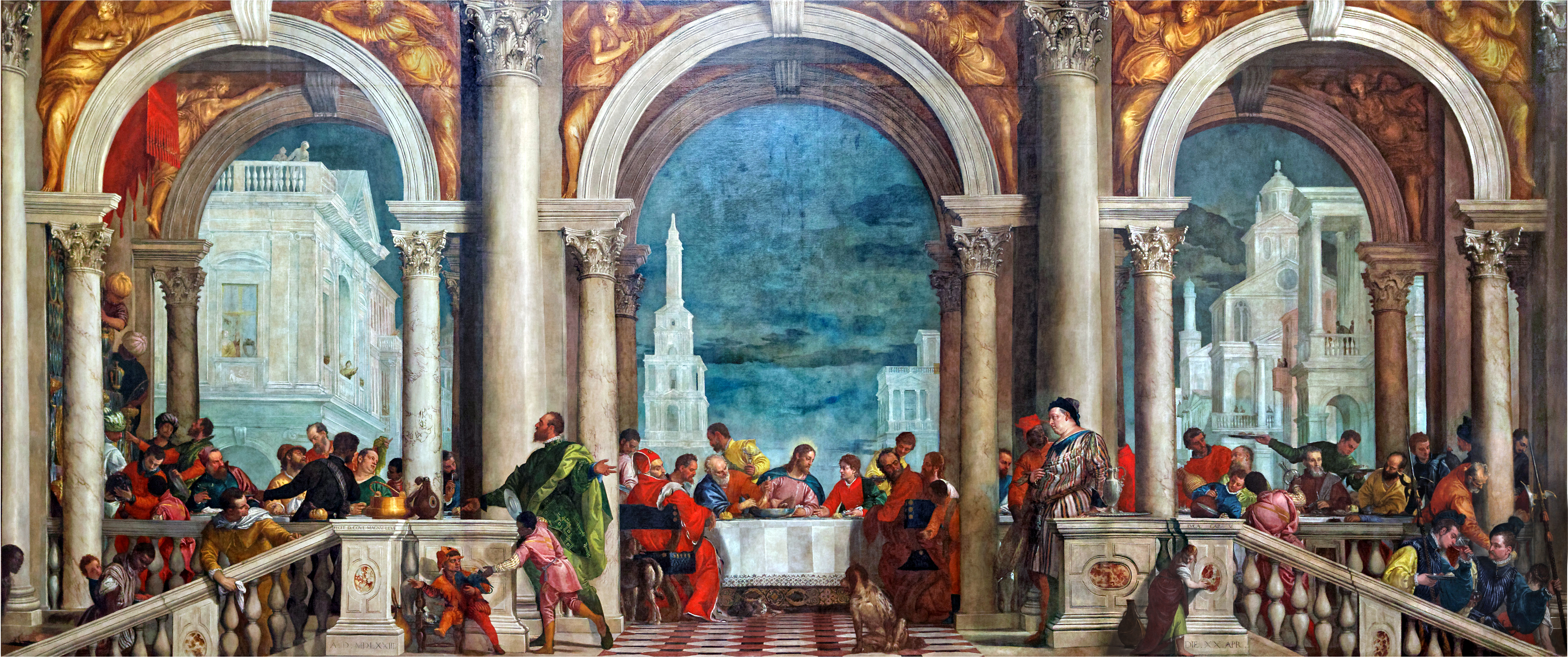
Paolo Veronese
The Feast in the House of Levi, 555 × 1280 cm

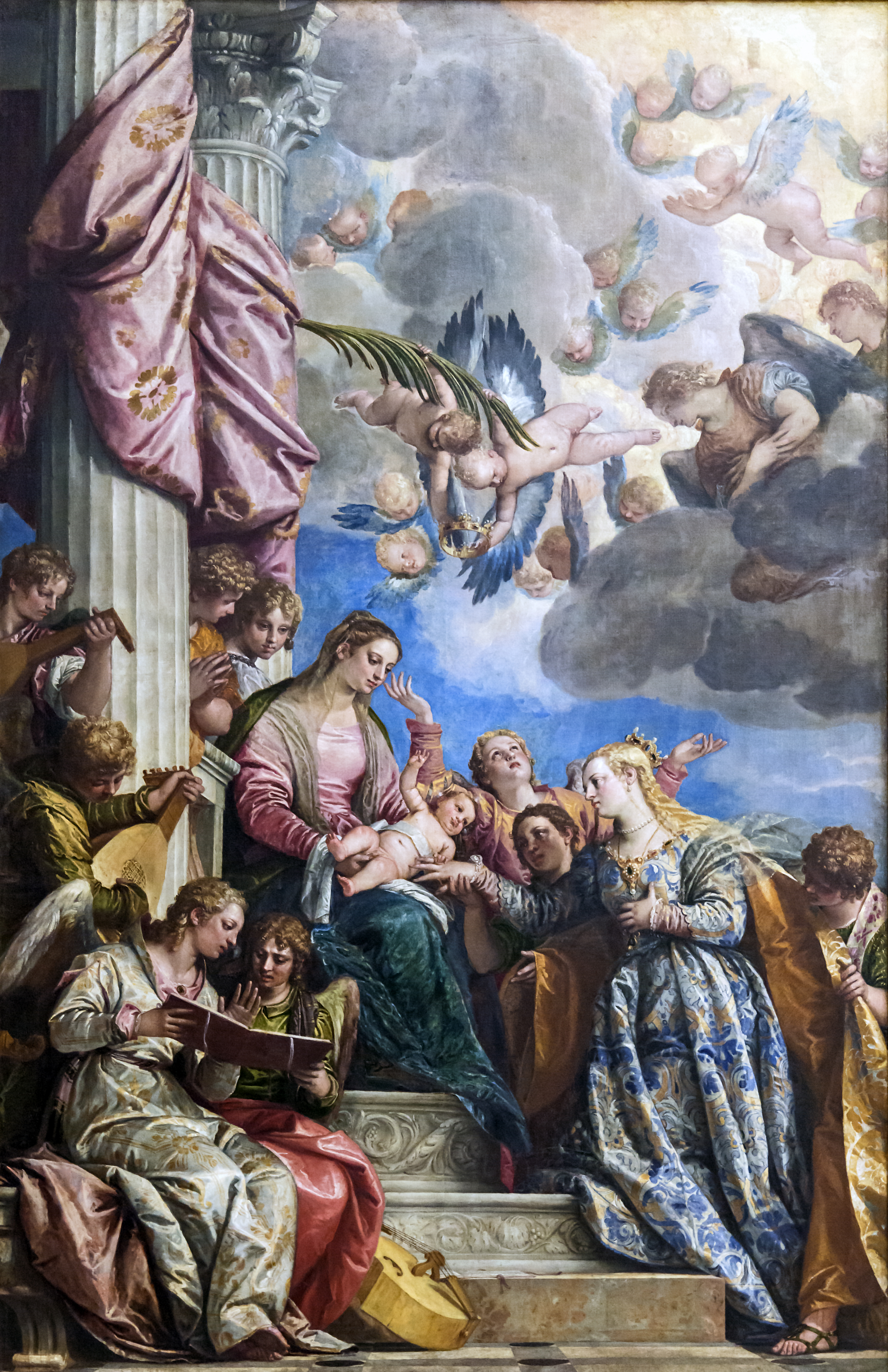
Paolo Veronese
Mystical Marriage of St Catherine, 337 × 241 cm

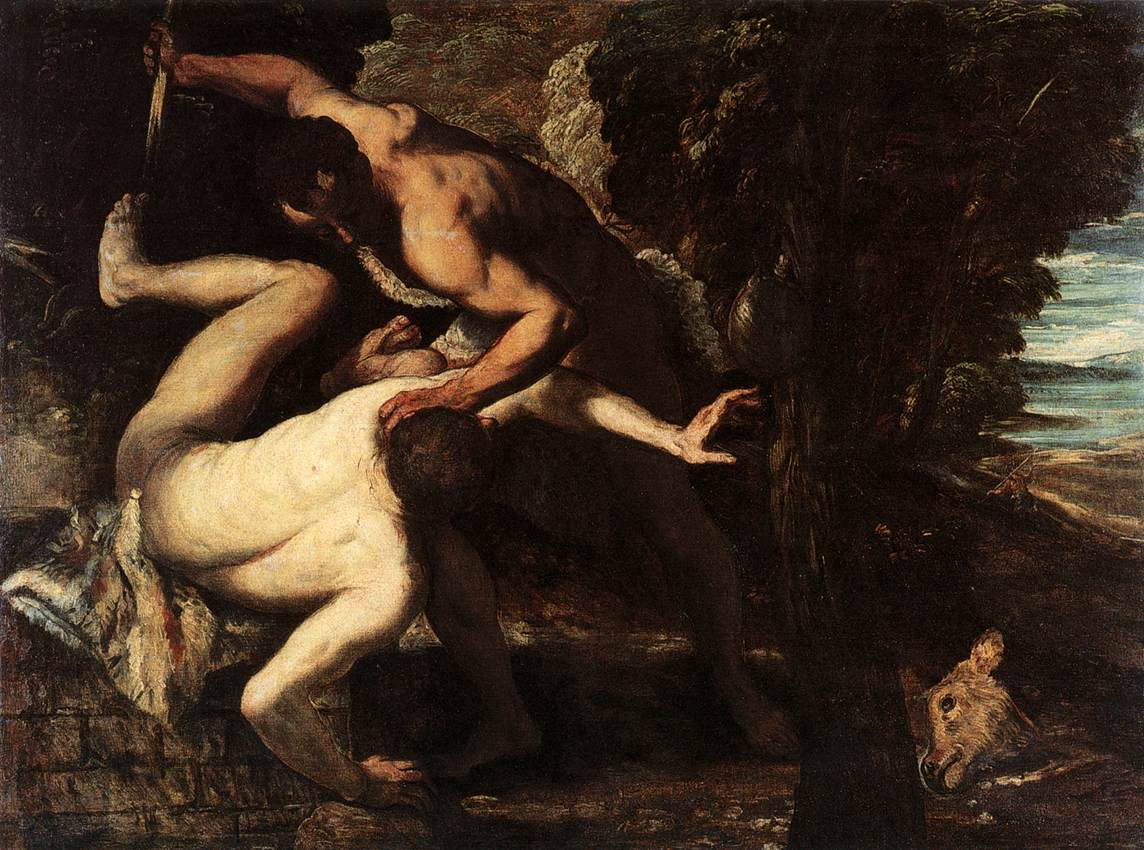
Tintoretto, The Murder of Abel, 149×196 cm

== See also ==
- List of art museums
- List of buildings and structures in Venice
- List of museums in Italy

Preceded by Doge's Palace	Venice landmarks Gallerie dell'Accademia	Succeeded by Grand Canal
