= Sacred Conversation (Bellini, Madrid, 1505–1510) =

Painting by Giovanni Bellini

- Nunc Dimittis (Latin)
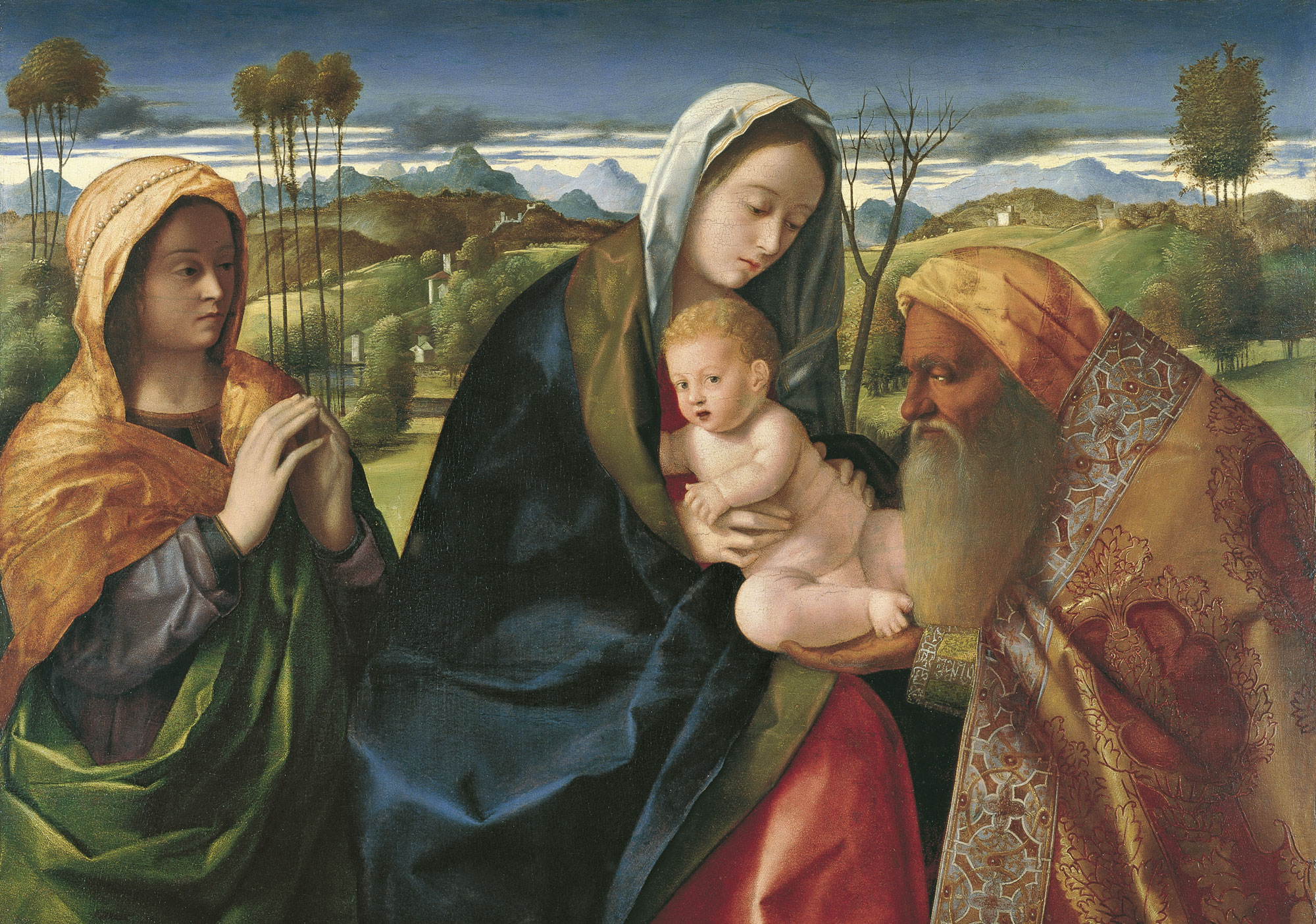
- Artist: Giovanni Bellini
- Year: c. 1505–1510
- Medium: oil on panel
- Dimensions: 62 cm × 83 cm (24 in × 33 in)
- Location: Museo Thyssen-Bornemisza, Madrid

Nunc Dimittis or Sacred Conversation is an oil-on-panel painting created ca. 1505–1510 by the Italian Renaissance master Giovanni Bellini. It measures 62 cm by 83 cm and is now in the Museo Thyssen-Bornemisza in Madrid. It belongs to the sacra conversazione genre and shows Anna and Simeon with the Madonna and Child.

== See also ==
- List of works by Giovanni Bellini
