= Madonna and Child with Saint Catherine and Saint Mary Magdalene =

Painting by Giovanni Bellini

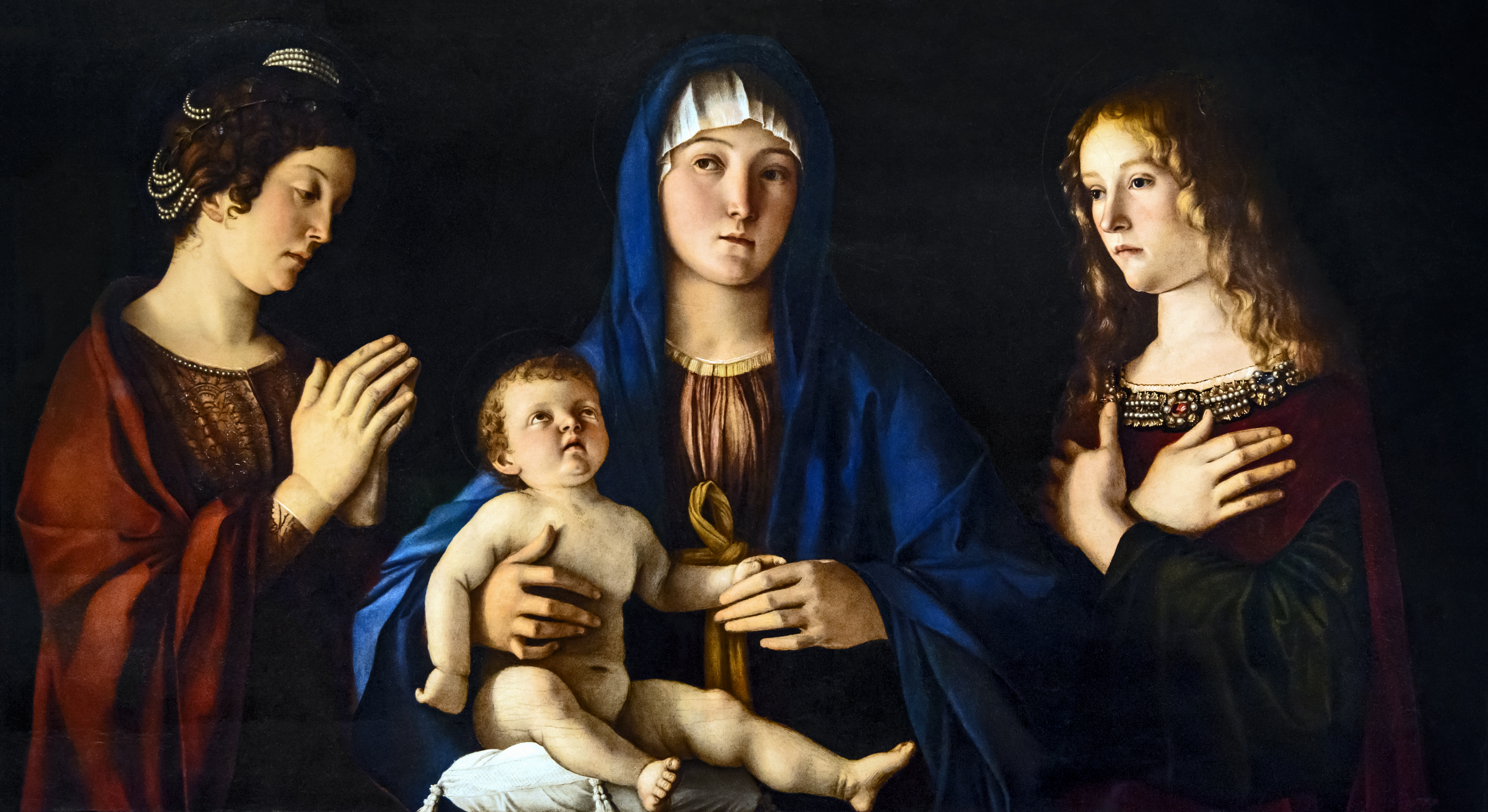
- Artist: Giovanni Bellini
- Year: circa 1490
- Medium: oil on panel
- Dimensions: 58 cm × 107 cm (23 in × 42 in)
- Location: Gallerie dell'Accademia, Venice

The Madonna and Child with Saint Catherine and Saint Mary Magdalene is an oil on panel painting by Giovanni Bellini, formerly in the Renier Collection in Venice and now in that city's Gallerie dell'Accademia. It dates to 1490, just after the Barbarigo Altarpiece and belongs to the popular sacra conversazione genre. The painting is also referred to as Sacred Conversation.
