= Saint Mark's Body Brought to Venice =

Painting by Tintoretto

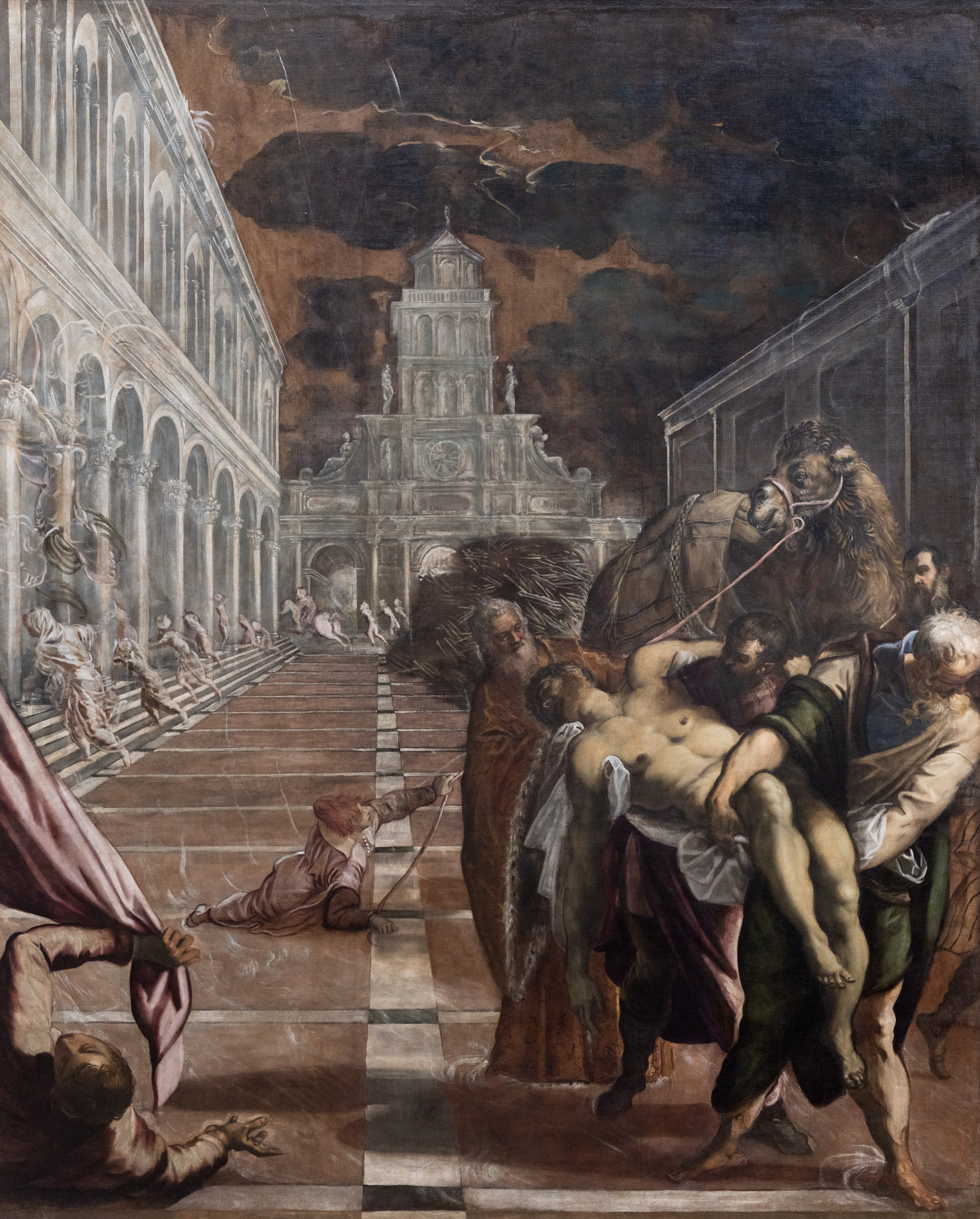
- Artist: Tintoretto
- Year: 1562–1566
- Medium: Oil on canvas
- Dimensions: 398 cm × 315 cm (157 in × 124 in)
- Location: Gallerie dell'Accademia; Venice

Saint Mark's Body Brought to Venice, The Abduction of the Body of Saint Mark or Translation of the Body of Saint Mark is a painting by Tintoretto depicting the translatio, or transfer of Saint Mark's relics from Alexandria to Venice. It was produced between 1562 and 1566 as part of a series of works on Saint Mark for the Sala Capitolare of the Scuola Grande di San Marco - the others are Miracle of the Slave, Saint Mark Saving a Saracen from Shipwreck and Finding of the Body of Saint Mark. It is now held in the Gallerie dell'Accademia in Venice.

== Composition ==
The painting is notable for its striking, deep perspective background lines. The colours are darker in the near subjects, while the figures in the background are white, nearly transparent. The strange red sky is roiling with ominous gray clouds, riven with a thunderbolt, affording the painting a heavy, dynamic atmosphere. Tintoretto depicted himself within the work as the bearded man beside the camel. He portrays Torcello and Malamocco carrying Mark's body as they arrived back in Venice. The Piazza San Marco, or St. Mark's Square is displayed in the painting with onlookers fleeing in the background. The public square appears narrow to convey the tenseness of the abduction of Saint Mark's body.

== Subject ==
Saint Mark spent most of his life in Alexandria, Egypt. His body was brought to Venice eight centuries after his death in AD 68. Venice's ruling class wanted St. Mark as the patron saint for their economic status, so they arranged to smuggle his body from Egypt. While stealing the body, the thieves Buono da Malamocco and Rustico da Torcello hid the body under pork and vegetables. Once they arrived in Venice on January 31, 828, Mark's body was kept in Doge Giustiniano's palace. When the doge died, his widow was ordered to build the Basilica di San Marco to house Mark. Fear that Saint Mark's body would be stolen again continued after the death of the Doge. According to a French monk, Mark's body was safely stored in "one of the great pillars". However, when the chapel of Basilica di San Marco was rebuilt in 1063, Saint Mark's body could not be found. Thirty years after this, it was said that Saint Mark's body re-appeared, with his arm appearing from an old pillar. After re-appearing, Saint Mark's body was finally put in a sculptured coffin below the high altar in the chapel.

== Sources ==
- Gillo Dorfles, Stefania Buganza e Jacopo Stoppa, Arti visive. Dal Quattrocento all'Impressionismo, Atlas, 2001
