= Tintoretto =

Italian painter (1518–1594)

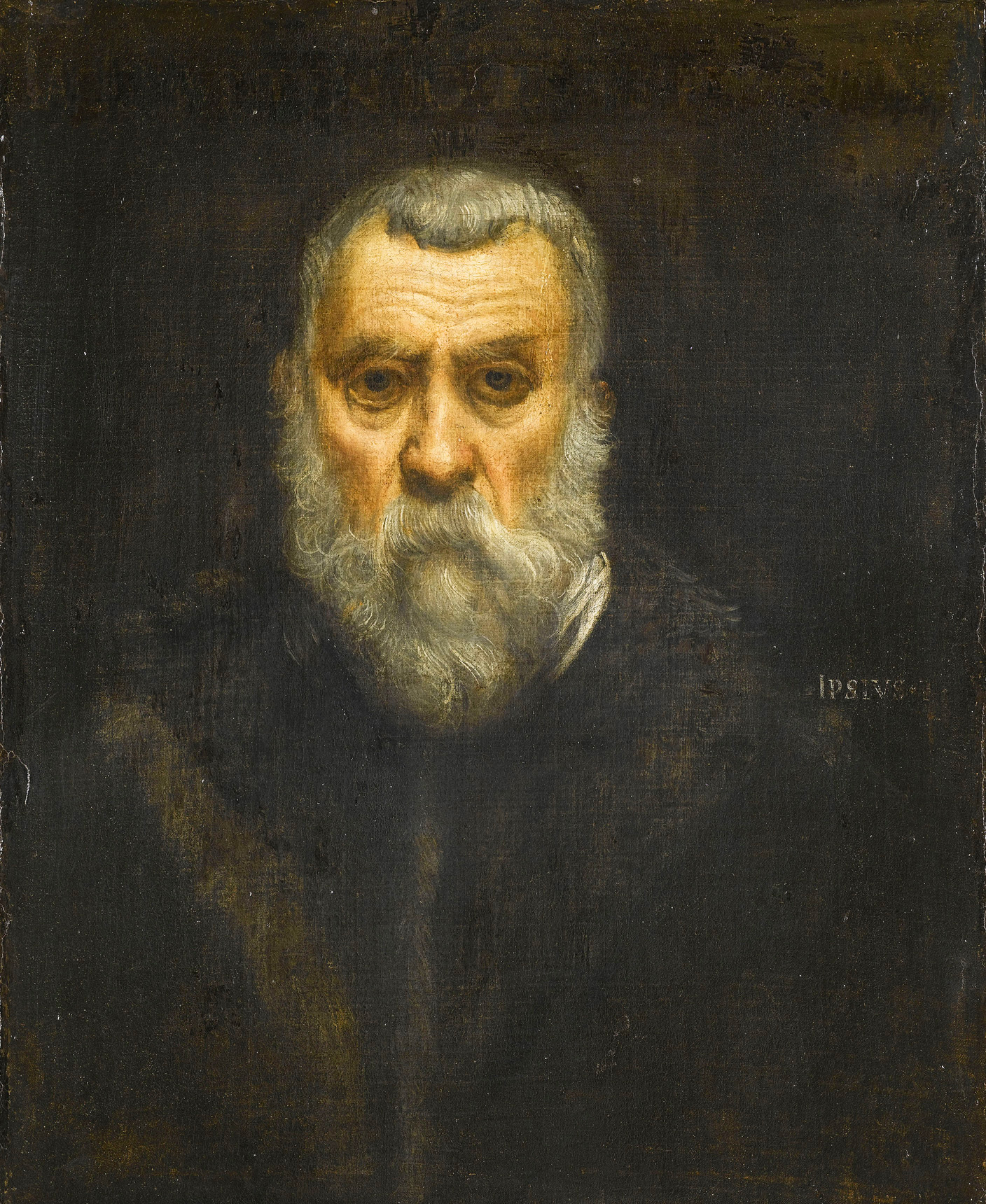
- Self-portrait, c. 1588; Louvre, Paris
- Born: Jacopo Robusti late September or early October 1518; Venice, Republic of Venice
- Died: 31 May 1594 (aged 75); Venice, Republic of Venice
- Known for: Painting
- Movement: Renaissance, Mannerism, Venetian School

Signature
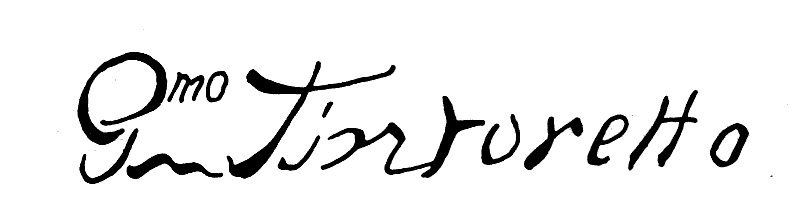

Jacopo Robusti (Note: According to historian Stefania Mason, the discovery and publication in 2004 of a "fanciful account" in a letter of 1678 to a Spanish art collector from his agent in Venice is responsible for a misconception that Jacopo's surname was Comin. Robusti is the name that appears in his tax declarations and other official documents.) (late September or early October 1518 – 31 May 1594), best known as Tintoretto (/ˌtɪntəˈrɛtoʊ/ TIN-tə-RET-oh; Italian: [tintoˈretto]; Venetian: [tiŋtoˈɾeto]), was an Italian Renaissance painter of the Venetian school. His contemporaries both admired and criticised the speed with which he painted and the unprecedented boldness of his brushwork. For his phenomenal energy in painting he was termed il Furioso (Italian for 'the Furious'). His work is characterised by muscular figures, dramatic gestures and bold use of perspective, in the Mannerist style.

== Life ==
=== The years of apprenticeship ===
Tintoretto was born in Venice in 1518. His father, Battista, was a dyer – tintore in Italian and tintor in Venetian; hence the son got the nickname of Tintoretto, "little dyer", or "dyer's boy". Tintoretto is known to have had at least one sibling, a brother named Domenico, although an unreliable 17th-century account says his siblings numbered 22. The family was believed to have originated from Brescia, in Lombardy, then part of the Republic of Venice. Older studies gave the Tuscan town of Lucca as the origin of the family.

Little is known of Tintoretto's childhood or training. According to his early biographers Carlo Ridolfi (1642) and Marco Boschini (1660), his only formal apprenticeship was in the studio of Titian, who angrily dismissed him after only a few days—either out of jealousy of so promising a student (in Ridolfi's account) or because of a personality clash (in Boschini's version). From this time forward the relationship between the two artists remained rancorous, despite Tintoretto's continued admiration for Titian. For his part, Titian actively disparaged Tintoretto, as did his adherents.

Tintoretto sought no further teaching but studied on his own account with laborious zeal. According to Ridolfi, he gained some experience by working alongside artisans who decorated furniture with paintings of mythological scenes, and studied anatomy by drawing live models and dissecting cadavers. He lived poorly, collecting casts, bas-reliefs, and prints, and practising with their aid. At some time, possibly in the 1540s, Tintoretto acquired models of Michelangelo's Dawn, Day, Dusk and Night, which he and his workshop studied in numerous drawings made from all angles on blue paper. Now and afterward he very frequently worked by night as well as by day. His noble conception of art and his high personal ambition were both evidenced in the inscription which he placed over his studio Il disegno di Michelangelo ed il colorito di Tiziano ("Michelangelo's drawing and Titian's colour").

=== Early works ===
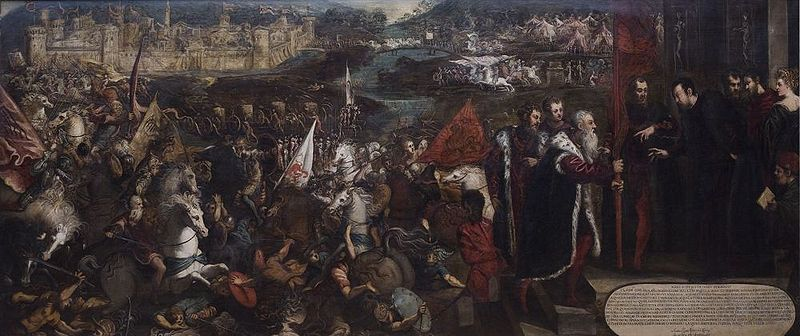
The Siege of Asola (1544–1545), National Museum, Poznań

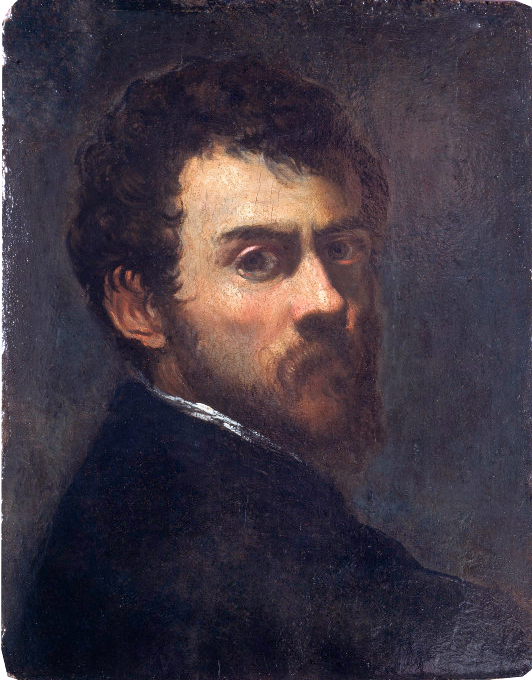
Self-Portrait as a Young Man, c. 1548

The young painter Andrea Schiavone, four years Tintoretto's junior, was much in his company. Tintoretto helped Schiavone at no charge with wall paintings, and in many subsequent instances, he also worked for nothing, and thus succeeded in obtaining commissions. The two earliest mural paintings of Tintoretto—done, like others, for next to no pay—are said to have been Belshazzar's Feast and a Cavalry Fight. These have both long since perished, as have all his frescoes, early or later. The first work of his to attract some considerable notice was a portrait group of himself and his brother—the latter playing the guitar—with a nocturnal effect; this has also been lost. It was followed by some historical subject, which Titian was candid enough to praise.

One of Tintoretto's early pictures still extant is in the church of the Carmine in Venice, the Presentation of Jesus in the Temple (c. 1542); also in S. Benedetto are the Annunciation and Christ with the Woman of Samaria. For the Scuola della Trinità (the scuole or schools of Venice were confraternities, more in the nature of charitable foundations than of educational institutions) he painted four subjects from Genesis. Two of these, now in the Gallerie dell'Accademia in Venice, are Adam and Eve and the Death of Abel, both noble works of high mastery, which indicate that Tintoretto was by this time a consummate painter—one of the few who have attained to the highest eminence in the absence of any recorded formal training. Until 2012, The Embarkation of St Helena in the Holy Land was attributed to Schiavone. But a new analysis of the work has revealed it as one of a series of three paintings by Tintoretto, depicting the legend of St Helena and the Holy Cross. The error was uncovered during work on a project to catalogue continental European oil paintings in the United Kingdom. The Embarkation of St Helena was acquired by the Victoria and Albert Museum in 1865. Its sister paintings, The Discovery of the True Cross and St Helen Testing the True Cross, are held in galleries in the United States.

=== Saint Mark paintings ===
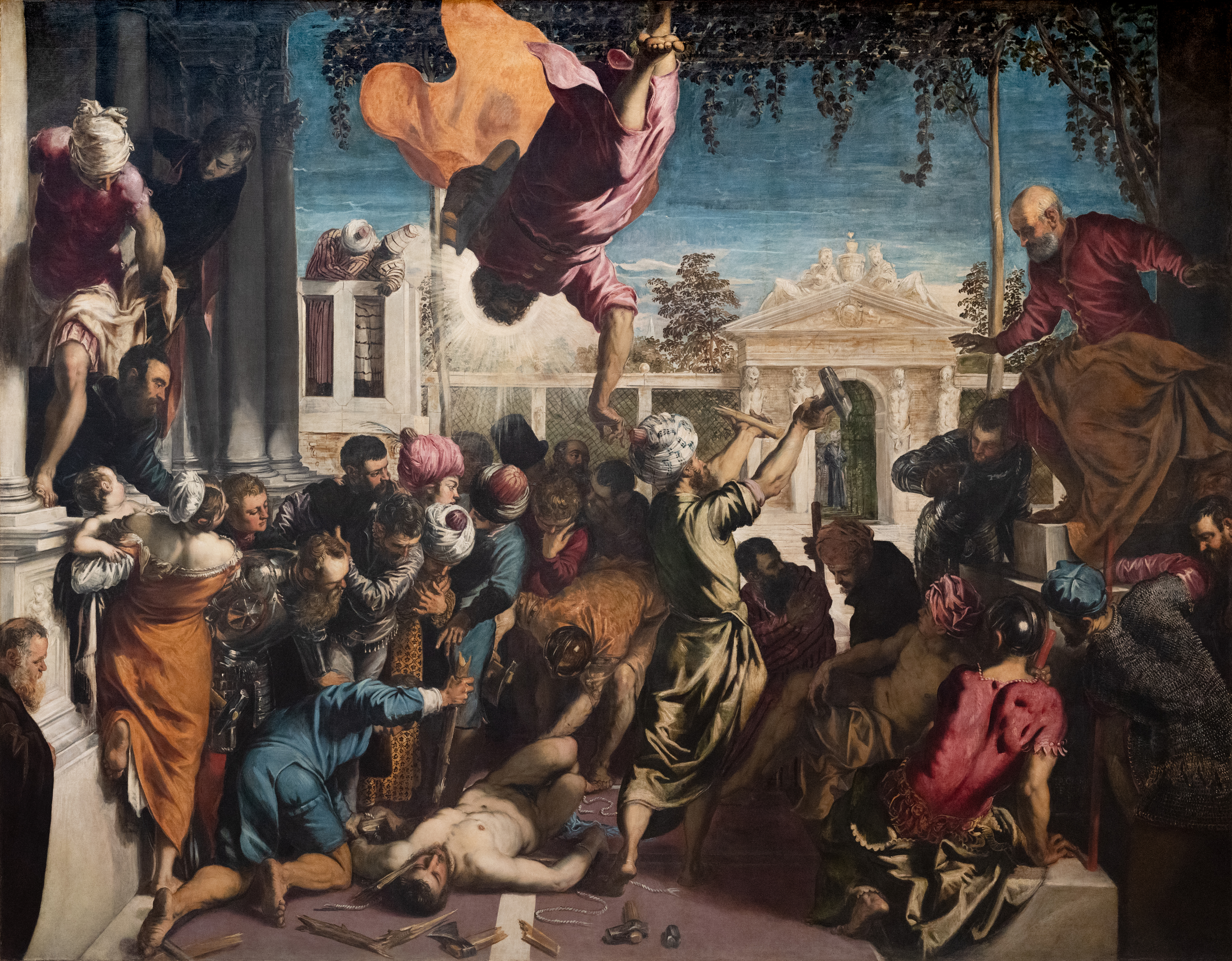
Miracle of the Slave (1548)

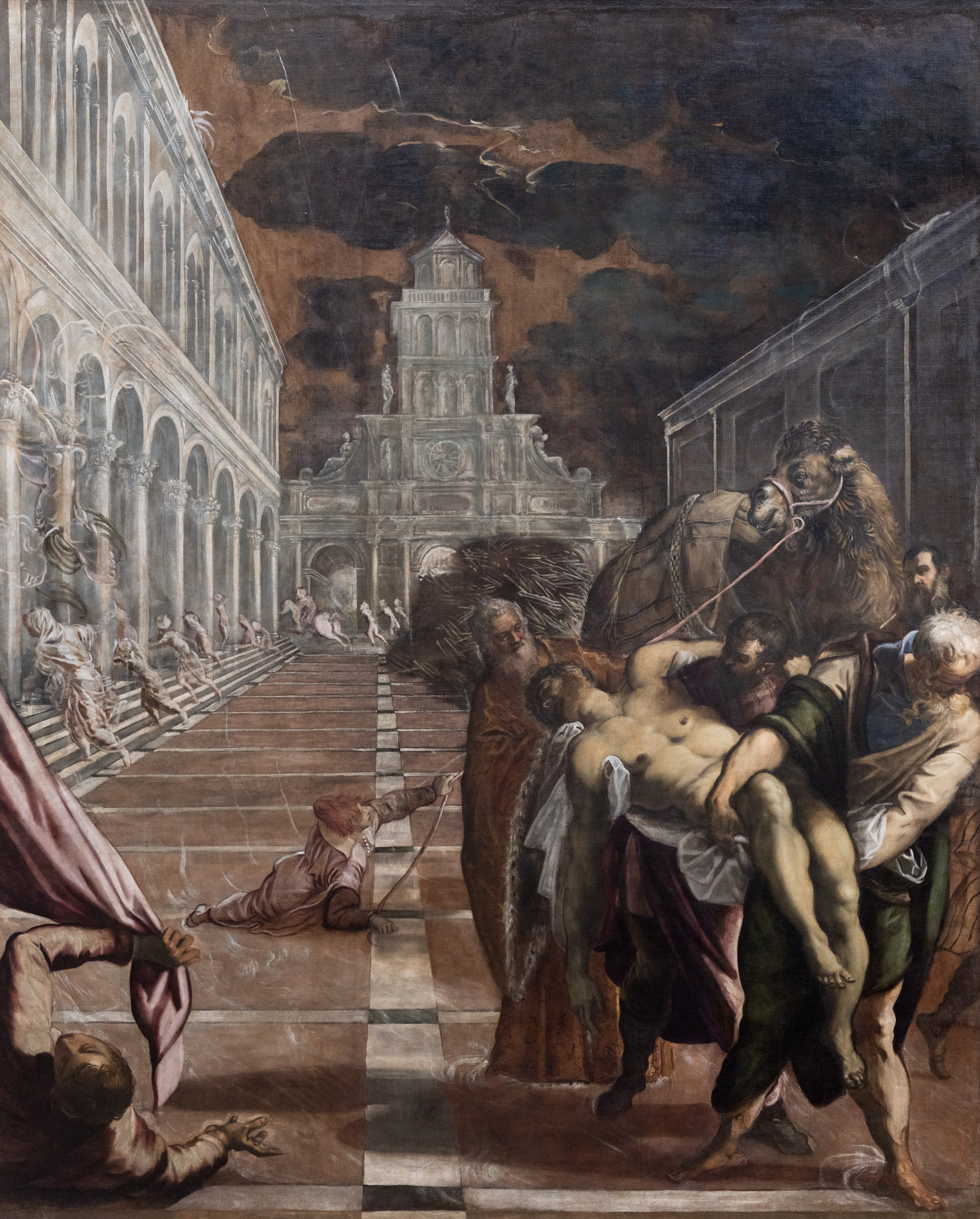
St Mark's Body Brought to Venice (c. 1564)

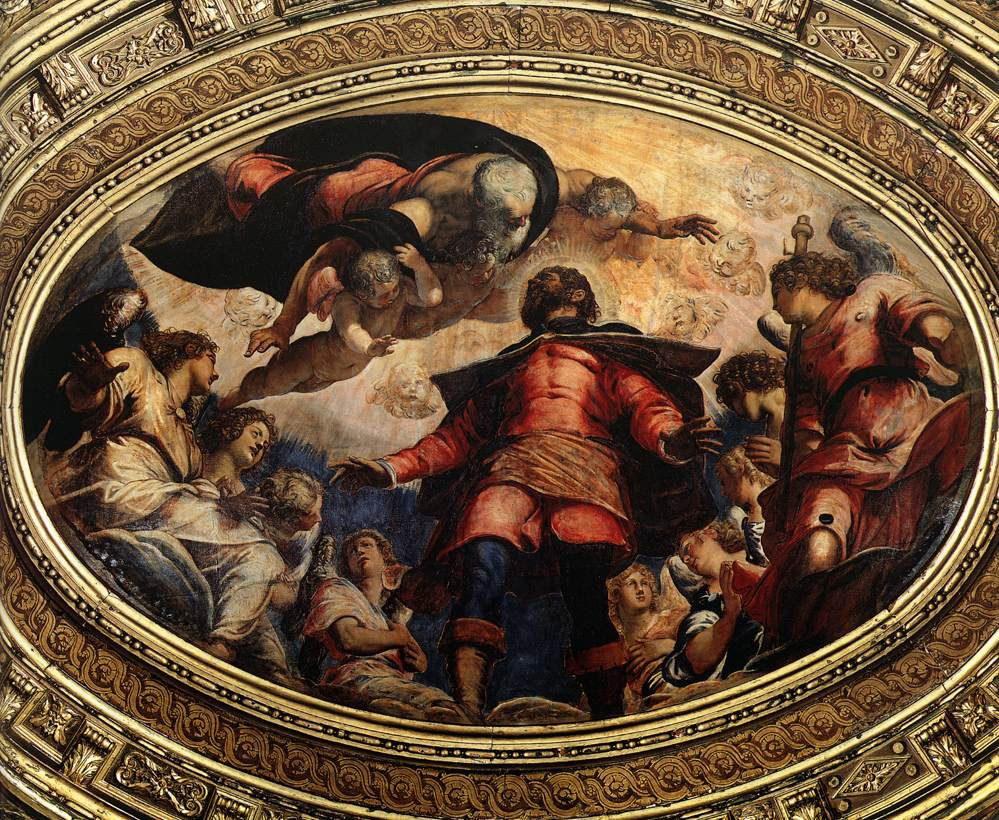
St Roch in Glory (1564)

In 1548 Tintoretto was commissioned to paint a large decoration for the Scuola di S. Marco: the Miracle of the Slave. Realising that the commission presented him with a singular opportunity to establish himself as a major artist, he took extraordinary care in arranging the composition for maximum effect. The painting represents the legend of a Christian slave or captive who was to be tortured as a punishment for some acts of devotion to the evangelist, but was saved by the miraculous intervention of the latter, who shattered the bone-breaking and blinding implements which were about to be applied. Tintoretto's conception of the narrative is distinguished by a marked theatricality, unusual colour choices, and vigorous execution.

The painting was a triumphant success, despite some detractors. Tintoretto's friend Pietro Aretino praised the work, calling particular attention to the figure of the slave, but warned Tintoretto against hasty execution. As a result of the painting's success, Tintoretto received numerous commissions. For the church of San Rocco he painted Saint Roch Cures the Plague Victims (1549), one of the first of Tintoretto's many laterali (horizontal paintings). These were large-scale paintings intended for the side walls of Venetian chapels. Knowing that the congregation would view them from an angle, Tintoretto composed the paintings with an off-centre perspective so the illusion of depth would be effective when seen from a viewpoint near the end of the painting that was closer to the worshippers.

Around 1555 he painted the Assumption of the Virgin, an oil-on-canvas painting for the church of Santa Maria dei Crociferi.

In 1551, Paolo Veronese arrived in Venice and quickly began receiving the prestigious commissions that Tintoretto coveted. Unwilling to be overshadowed by his new rival, Tintoretto approached the leaders of his neighbourhood church, the Madonna dell'Orto, with a proposal to paint for them two colossal canvases on a cost-only basis. He had already painted the Presentation of the Virgin in the Temple (c. 1556), one of his major works, for the church; it repeats a subject that had earlier been painted by Titian, but in place of Titian's classically balanced composition is a startling visual drama of figures arranged on a receding staircase. Tintoretto now intended to create a sensation by painting for the Madonna dell'Orto the two tallest canvases ever painted during the Renaissance. He settled down in a house near the church, looking over the Fondamenta de Mori, which is still standing.

Depicting the Worship of the Golden Calf and the Last Judgment, the 14.5 metres (47.6 feet) tall paintings (both c. 1559–1560) were widely admired, and Tintoretto gained a reputation for his ability to complete the most massive projects on a limited budget. Thereafter, Tintoretto habitually competed against rival painters by producing paintings quickly at a low cost. In about 1564, Tintoretto painted three additional works for Scuola di S. Marco: the Finding of the body of St Mark, the St Mark's Body Brought to Venice, and St Mark Rescuing a Saracen from Shipwreck.

About 1560, Tintoretto married his second wife, Faustina de Vescovi, daughter of a Venetian nobleman who was the guardian grande of the Scuola Grande di San Marco.

=== Scuola di San Rocco ===
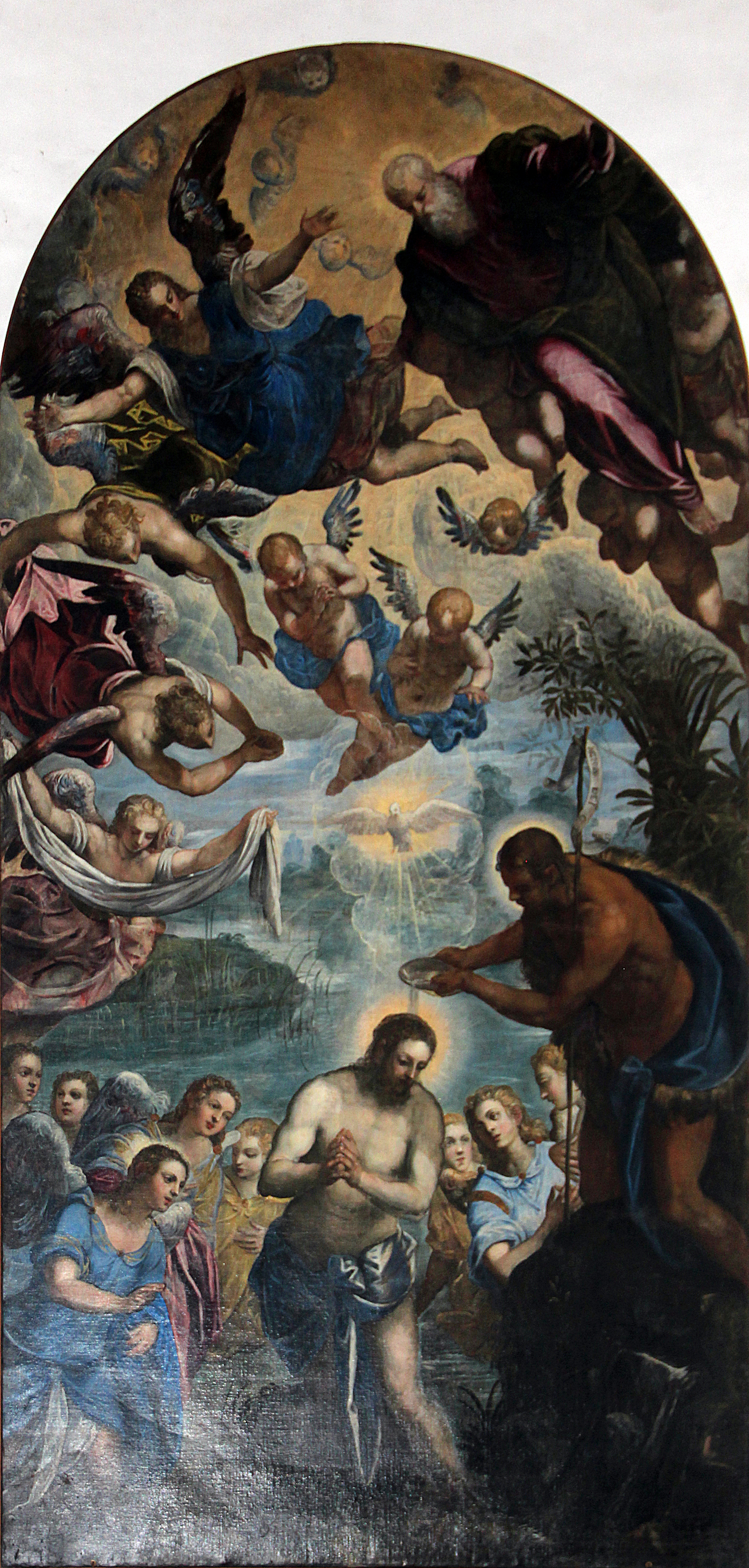
Baptism of Jesus, San Pietro Martire, Murano

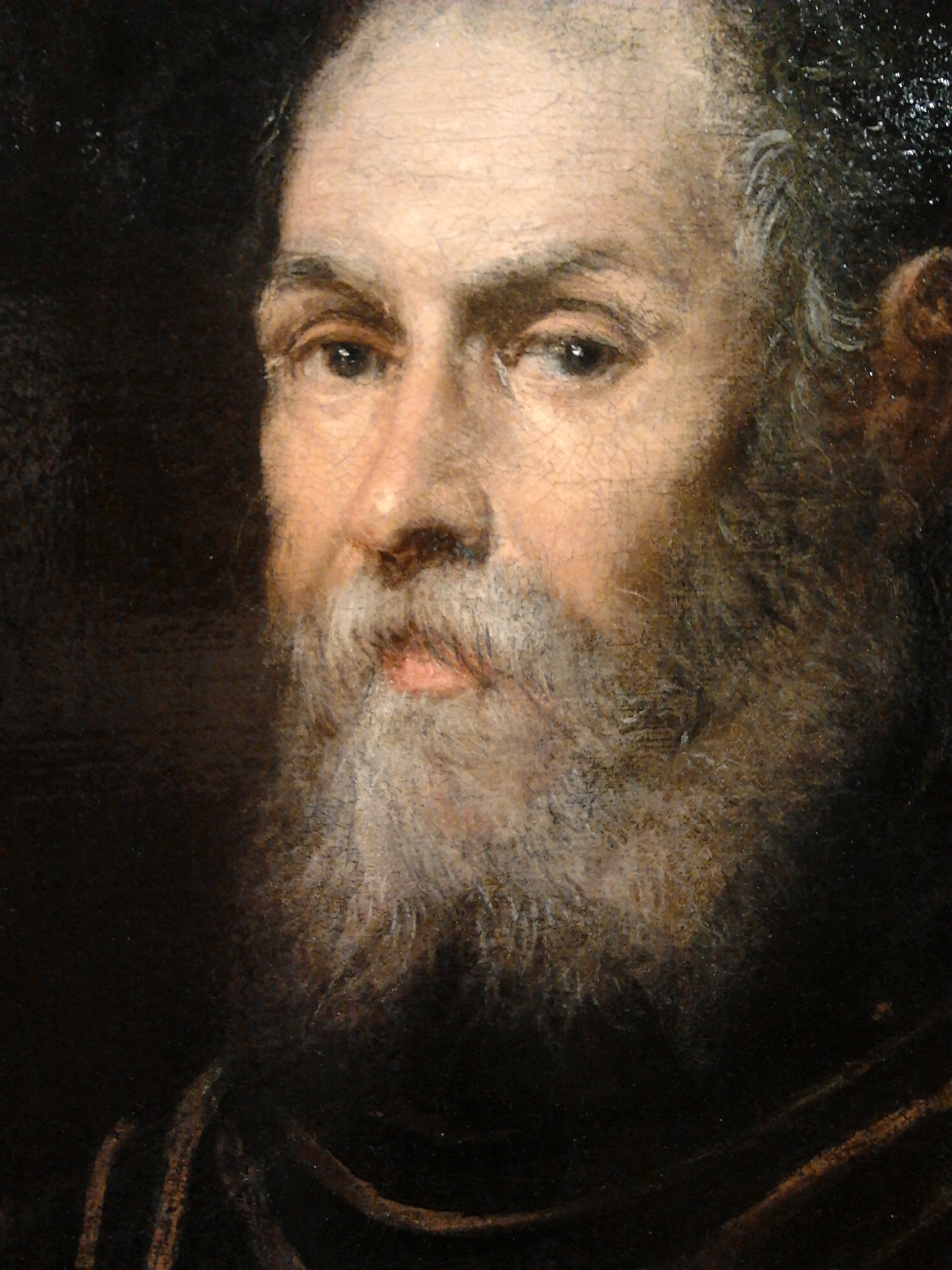
Detail of Portrait of a Venetian admiral (1570s, National Museum in Warsaw) where the original undercoat shines through the bold brushstrokes.

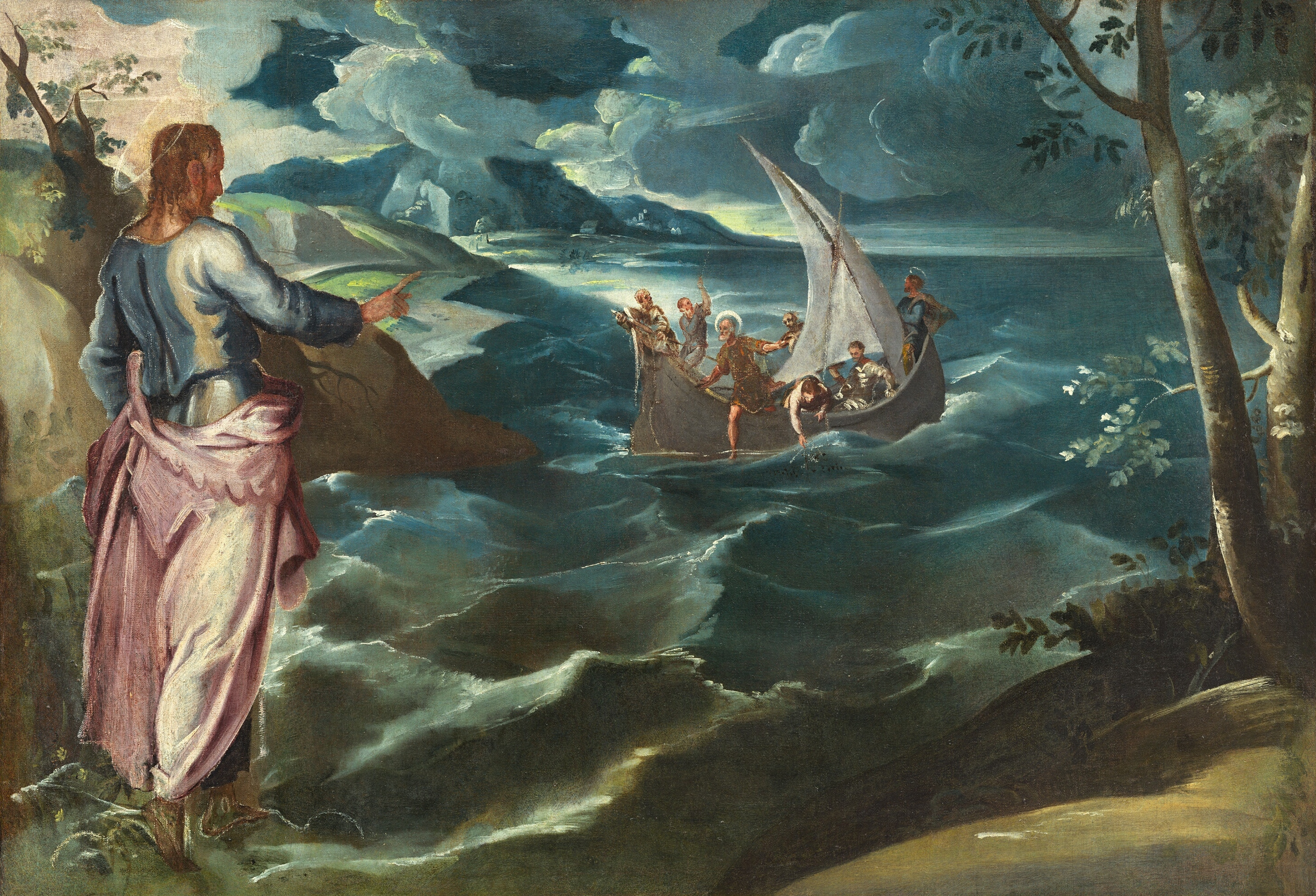
Christ at the Sea of Galilee (c. 1575–1580)

Between 1565 and 1567, and again from 1575 to 1588, Tintoretto produced a large number of paintings for the walls and ceilings of the Scuola Grande di San Rocco. The first room he painted was Sala dell'Allbergo, filled with scenes from the Passion of Christ. The subterfuge by which he won the commission has been called "the most notorious incident of Tintoretto's career". In 1564, four finalists—Tintoretto, Federico Zuccaro, Giuseppe Salviati, and Paolo Veronese — were invited by the Scuola to submit modelli for a ceiling painting on the subject of Saint Roch in Glory to decorate the hall called the Sala dell'Albergo. Instead of a sketch, Tintoretto produced a full-sized painting, secretly installed it on the ceiling, and presented it as a fait accompli on the day of the competition. Tintoretto then announced that he was offering the painting as a gift — perhaps conscious that a bylaw of the foundation prohibited the rejection of any gift.

In 1565, he resumed work at the scuola, painting the Crucifixion, for which a sum of 250 ducats was paid. In 1576 he presented gratis another centre-piece — that for the ceiling of the great hall, representing the Plague of Serpents; and in the following year he completed this ceiling with pictures of the Paschal Feast and Moses striking the Rock accepting whatever pittance the confraternity chose to pay.

The development of fast painting techniques called prestezza allowed him to produce many works while engaged on large projects and to respond to growing demands from clients. This, and his use of assistants, enabled Tintoretto ultimately to produce a greater number of paintings for the Venetian state than any of his competitors.

Tintoretto next launched out into the painting of the entire scuola and of the adjacent church of San Rocco. In November 1577, he offered to execute the works at the rate of 100 ducats per annum, with three pictures being due each year. This proposal was accepted and was punctually fulfilled, the painter's death alone preventing the execution of some of the ceiling subjects. The whole sum paid for the scuola throughout was 2,447 ducats. Disregarding some minor performances, the scuola and church contain fifty-two memorable paintings, which may be described as vast suggestive sketches, with the mastery, but not the deliberate precision, of finished pictures, and adapted for being looked at in a dusky half-light. Adam and Eve, the Visitation, the Adoration of the Magi, the Massacre of the Innocents, the Agony in the Garden, Christ before Pilate, Christ carrying His Cross and (this alone having been marred by restoration) the Assumption of the Virgin are leading examples in the scuola; in the church, Christ Curing the Paralytic.

It was probably in 1560, the year in which he began working in the Scuola di S. Rocco, that Tintoretto commenced his numerous paintings in the Doge's Palace; he then executed there a portrait of the Doge, Girolamo Priuli. Other works (destroyed by a fire in the palace in 1577) succeeded—the Excommunication of Frederick Barbarossa by Pope Alexander III and the Victory of Lepanto.

After the fire, Tintoretto started afresh, Paolo Veronese being his colleague. In the Sala dell'Anticollegio, Tintoretto painted four masterpieces — Bacchus, with Ariadne crowned by Venus, the Three Graces and Mercury, Minerva discarding Mars, and the Forge of Vulcan, which were painted for fifty ducats each, excluding materials, c. 1578; in the hall of the senate, Venice, Queen of the Sea (1581–1584); in the hall of the college, the Espousal of St Catherine to Jesus (1581–1584); in the Antichiesetta, Saint George, Saint Louis, and the Princess, and St Jerome and St Andrew; in the hall of the great council, nine large compositions, chiefly battle-pieces (1581–1584); in the Sala dello Scrutinio the Capture of Zara from the Hungarians in 1346 amid a Hurricane of Missiles (1584–1587).

=== Paradise ===
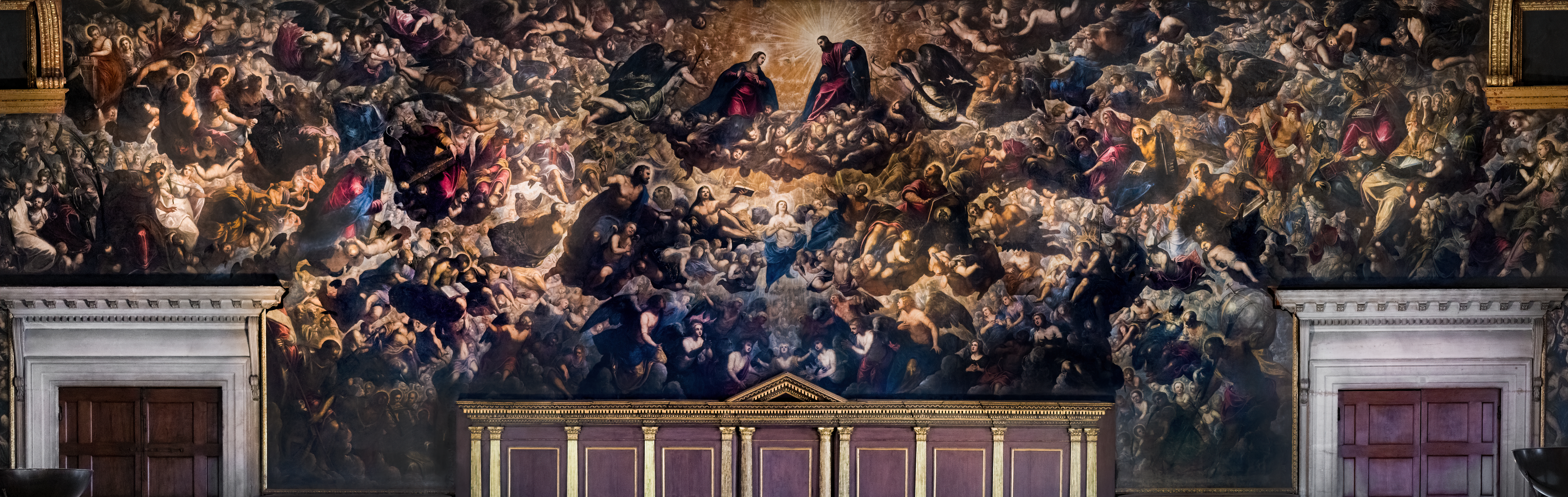
Paradise

The crowning production of Tintoretto's life was the vast Paradise painted for the Doge's Palace, in size 9.1 by 22.6 metres (29.9 by 74.1 feet), reputed to be the largest painting ever done upon canvas. While the commission for this huge work was yet pending and unassigned Tintoretto was wont to tell the senators that he had prayed to God that he might be commissioned for it, so that paradise itself might perchance be his recompense after death.

Tintoretto competed with several other artists for the prestigious commission. A large sketch of the composition he submitted in 1577 is now in the Louvre, Paris. In 1583, he painted a second sketch with a different composition, which is in the Thyssen-Bornemisza Museum, Madrid.

The commission was given jointly to Paolo Veronese and Francesco Bassano, but Veronese died in 1588 before starting the work, and the commission was reassigned to Tintoretto. He set up his canvas in the Scuola vecchia della Misericordia and worked indefatigably at the task, making many alterations and doing various heads and costumes direct from life.

When the painting had been nearly completed he took it to its proper place, where it was completed largely by assistants, his son Domenico foremost among them. All Venice applauded the finished work; Ridolfi wrote that "it seemed to everyone that heavenly beatitude had been disclosed to mortal eyes." Modern art historians have been less enthusiastic and have generally considered the Paradise inferior in execution to the two sketches. It has suffered from neglect, but little from restoration.

Tintoretto was asked to name his own price, but this he left to the authorities. They tendered a handsome amount; he is said to have abated something from it, an incident perhaps more telling of his lack of greed than earlier cases where he worked for nothing at all.

== Pupils ==
Tintoretto had very few pupils; his daughter, Marietta, his two sons, and Maerten de Vos of Antwerp were among them. Marietta had been a frequent companion with Tintoretto in her childhood and became an accomplished artist. His son Domenico Tintoretto frequently assisted his father in the preliminary work for great pictures. He painted a multitude of works, many of them of a very large scale. At best, they would be considered mediocre and, coming from the son of Tintoretto, are disappointing. In any event, he must be regarded as a considerable pictorial practitioner in his way.

=== Influence ===
There are reflections of Tintoretto to be found in the Greek painter of the Spanish Renaissance El Greco, who likely saw his works during a stay in Venice, and studied them well enough that they influenced his painting style.

== Personality ==
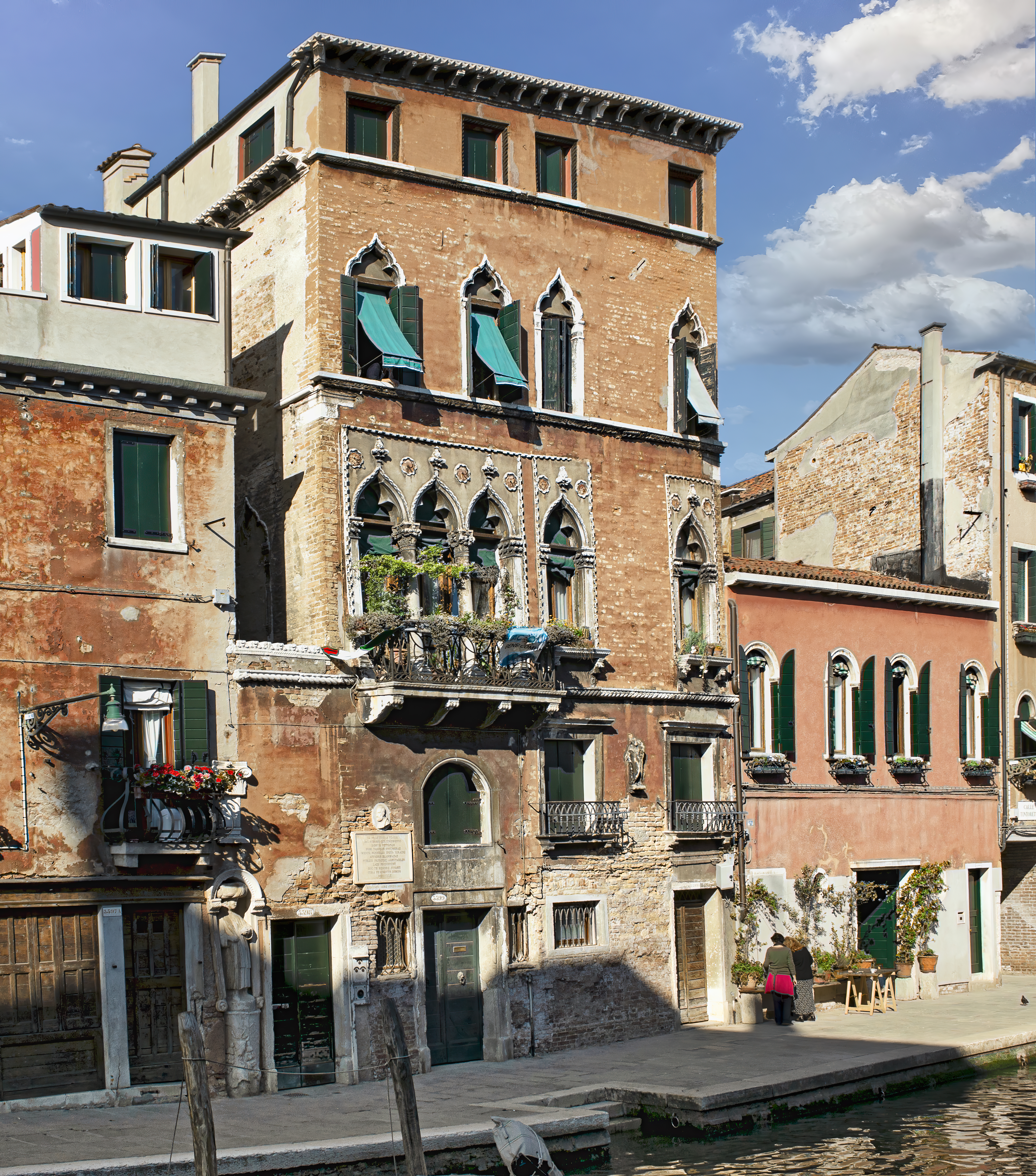
House of Tintoretto, "Fondamenta dei Mori", in Cannaregio, Venice

Tintoretto scarcely ever travelled away from Venice. His early biographers write of his intelligence and fierce ambition; according to Carlo Ridolfi, "he was always thinking of ways to make himself known as the most daring painter in the world."

He loved all the arts and as a youth played the lute and various instruments, some of them of his own invention, and designed theatrical costumes and properties. He was well versed in mechanics and mechanical devices also.

He lived in a mostly retired fashion. Even when not painting, he habitually stayed in his working room surrounded by casts. Here, he hardly admitted anyone, even close friends, and he kept his work methods secret, shared only with his assistants. He was full of pleasant witty sayings, whether to great personages or to others, but he himself seldom smiled.

Tintoretto maintained friendships with many writers and publishers, including Pietro Aretino, who became an important early patron.

== Marriages and children ==
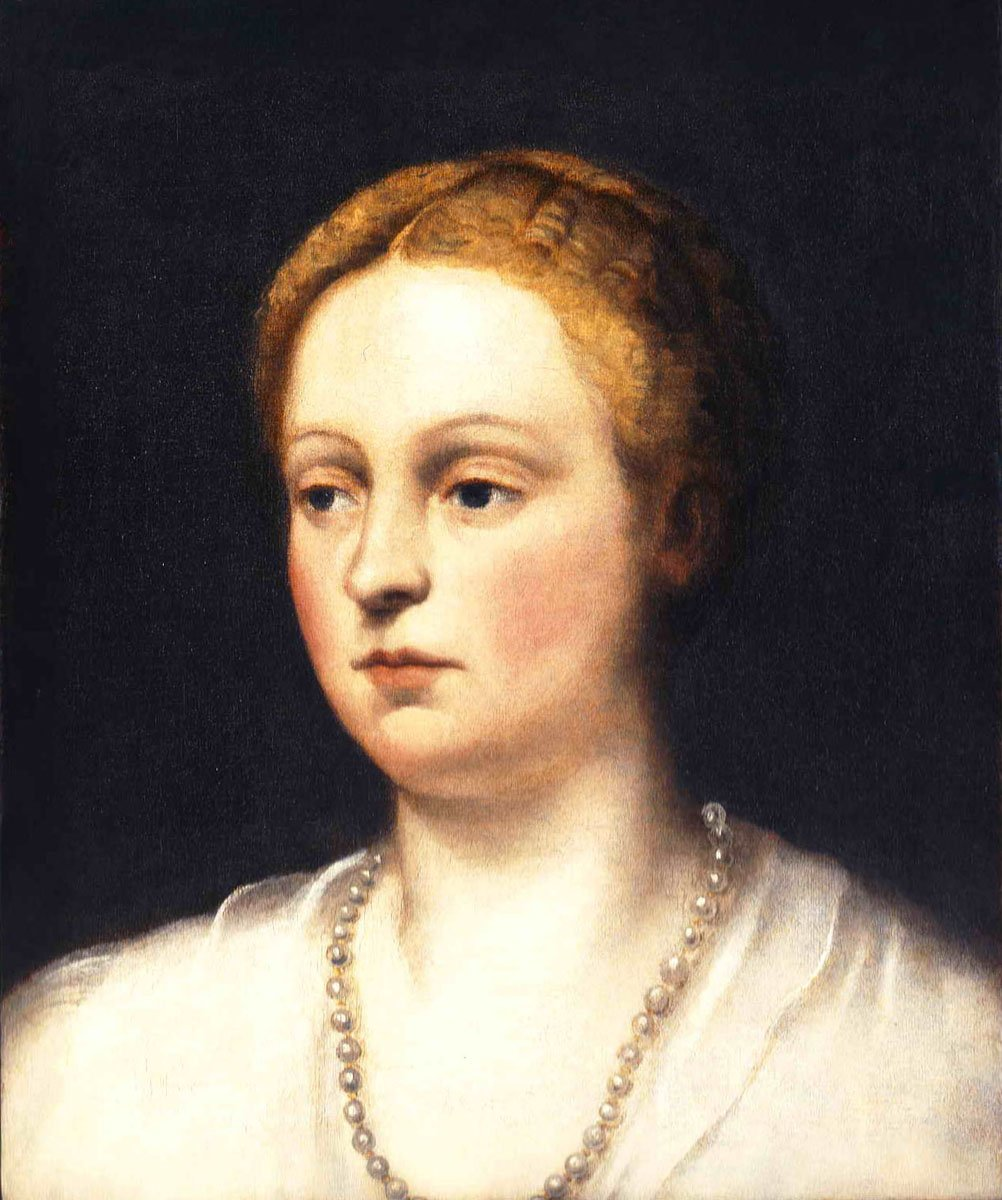
Portrait of a Lady by Tintoretto is of his daughter, Marietta

In about 1560, Tintoretto married his second wife, Faustina de Vescovi, daughter of a Venetian nobleman who was the guardian grande of the Scuola Grande di San Marco. Faustina and he had many children, of whom three sons (Domenico, Marco, and Zuan Battista) and four daughters (Gierolima, Lucrezia, Ottavia, and Laura) survived to adulthood. She appears to have been a careful housekeeper and able to mollify her husband. Faustina made him wear the robe of a Venetian citizen when outdoors. If it rained, she tried to make him wear an outer garment that he resisted. When he prepared to leave the house, she would wrap money up for him in a handkerchief, expecting a strict accounting upon his return. Tintoretto's customary reply was that he had spent it on alms for the poor or for prisoners.

Before his marriage to Faustina, Tintoretto had a daughter, Marietta Robusti, whose mother is not known. She became highly regarded as a painter, having been trained as an artist by Tintoretto, as he would later with her half-brothers Domenico and Marco. Marietta was a portrait painter of considerable skill, as well as a musician, vocalist, and instrumentalist. Few of her works are now traceable. As a girl, she used to accompany and assist her father at his work, dressed as a boy. Eventually, Marietta married a jeweller, Mario Augusta. Tradition suggests that as she lay in her final repose at the age of thirty, her heart-stricken father painted her final portrait among the many her father painted of her.

=== Death ===
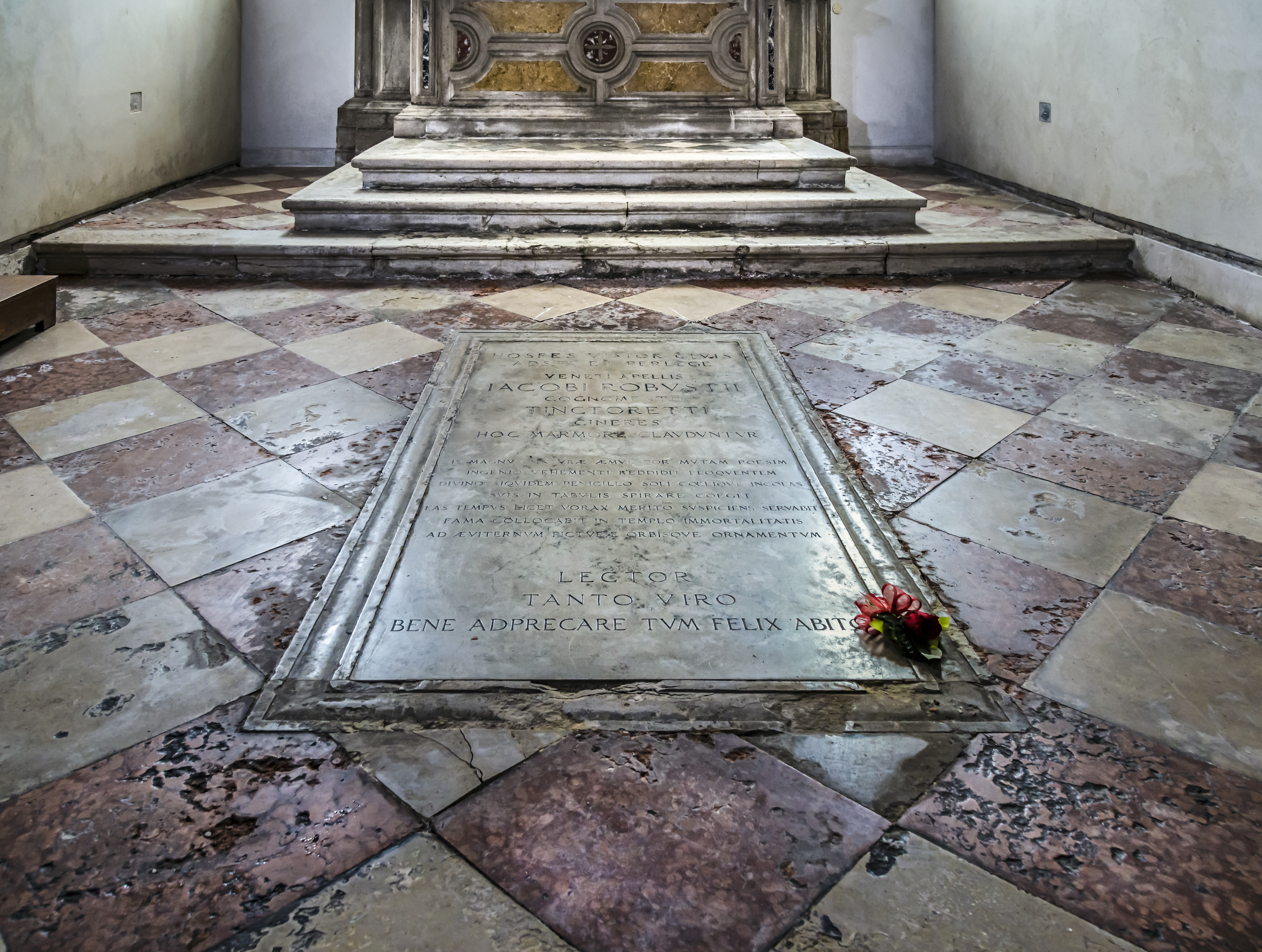
His grave, in the Madonna dell'Orto

After the completion of the Paradise Tintoretto rested for a while, and he never undertook any other work of importance, although there is no reason to suppose that his energies were exhausted. In 1592, he became a member of the Scuola dei Mercanti.

In 1594, he was seized with severe stomach pains, complicated with fever, that prevented him from sleeping and almost from eating for a fortnight. He died on 31 May 1594. He was buried in the church of the Madonna dell'Orto by the side of his favourite daughter Marietta, who had died in 1590 at the age of thirty.

In 1866, the grave of the Vescovi—his wife's family—and Tintoretto was opened, and the remains of nine members of the joint families were found in it. The grave was then moved to a new location, to the right of the choir.

== Style ==
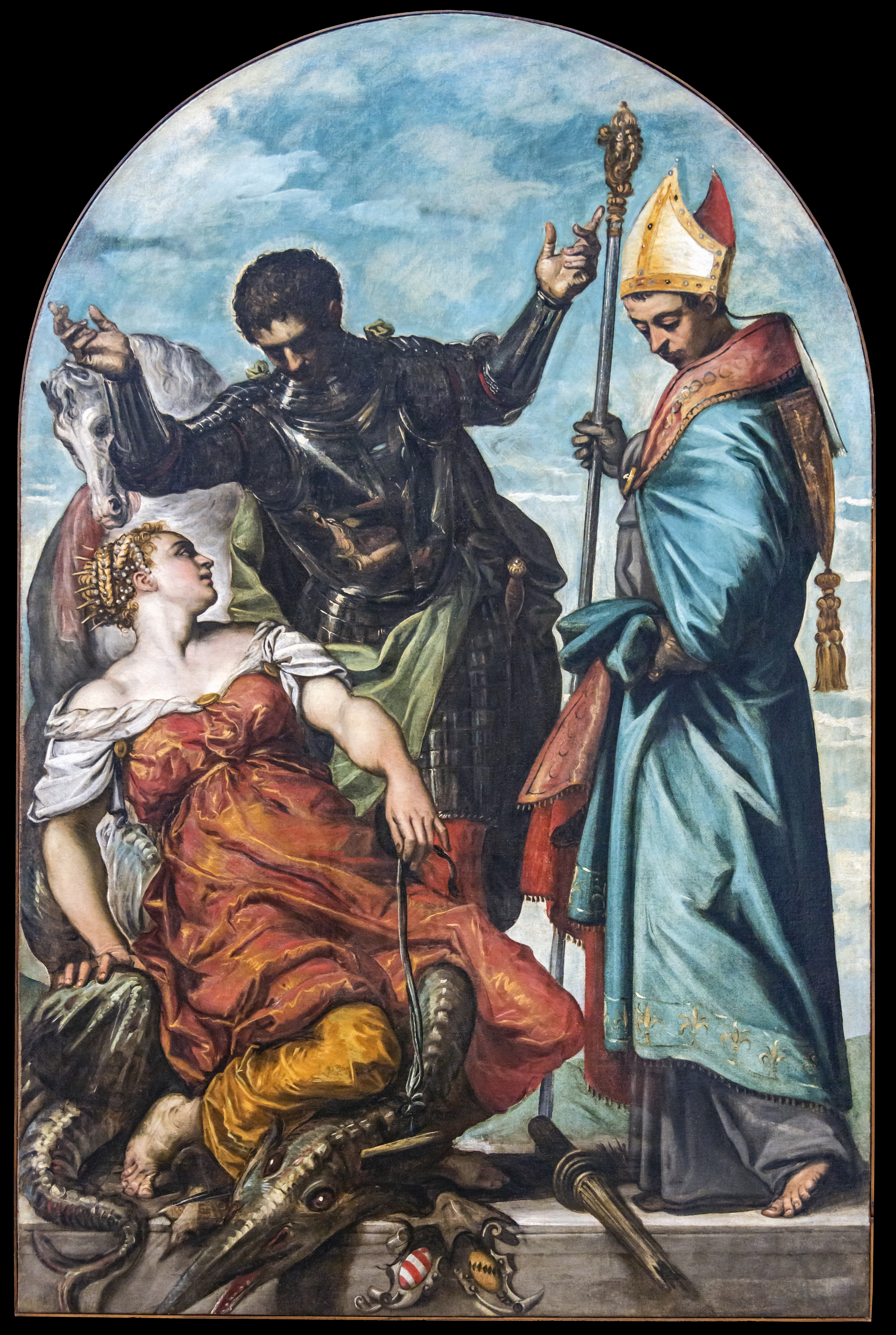
Saint George, Saint Louis, and the Princess (1553)

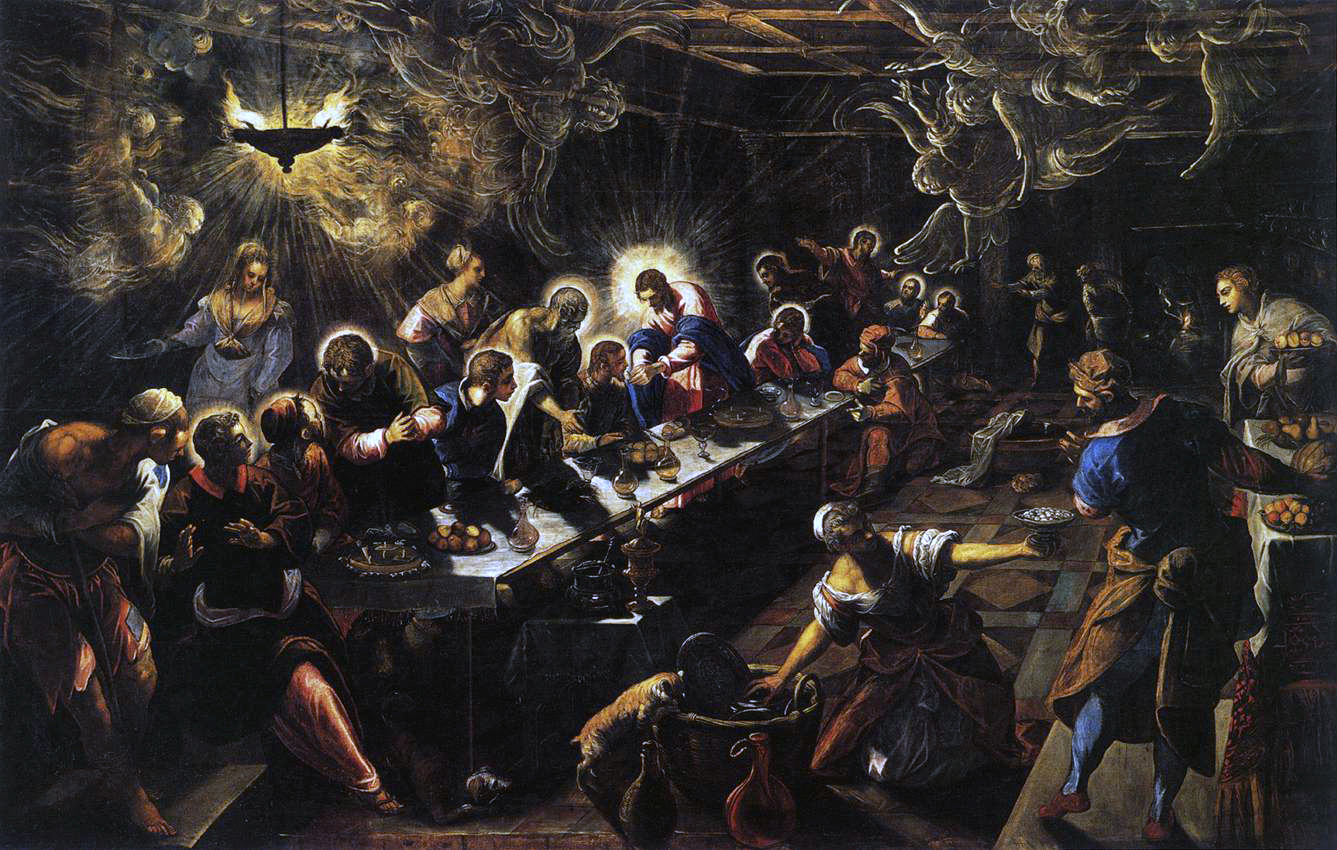
The Last Supper (1594)

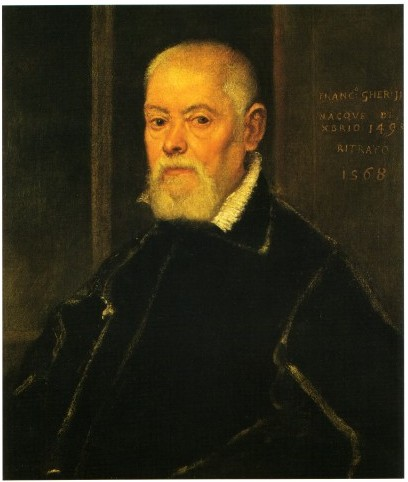
Portrait of Marquis Francesco Gherardini (1568), Ca' Rezzonico Museum, Venice

Tintoretto's style of painting is characterised by bold brushwork and the use of long strokes to define contours and highlights. His paintings emphasise the energy of human bodies in motion and often exploit extreme foreshortening and perspective effects to heighten the drama. Narrative content is conveyed by the gestures and dynamism of the figures rather than by facial expressions.

An agreement is extant showing a plan to finish two historical paintings—each containing twenty figures, seven being portraits—in a two-month period of time. Sebastiano del Piombo remarked that Tintoretto could paint in two days as much as himself in two years; Annibale Carracci that Tintoretto was in many of his pictures equal to Titian, in others inferior to Tintoretto. This was the general opinion of the Venetians, who said that he had three pencils—one of gold, the second of silver and the third of iron.

Tintoretto's pictorial wit is evident in compositions such as Saint George, Saint Louis, and the Princess (1553). He subverts the usual portrayal of the subject, in which Saint George slays the dragon and rescues the princess; here, the princess sits astride the dragon, holding a whip. The result is described by art critic Arthur Danto as having "the edginess of a feminist joke" as "the princess has taken matters into her own hands [...] George spreads his arms in a gesture of male helplessness, as his lance lies broken on the ground [...] It was obviously painted with a sophisticated Venetian audience in mind."

A comparison of Tintoretto's final The Last Supper—one of his nine known paintings on the subject— with Leonardo da Vinci's treatment of the same subject provides an instructive demonstration of how artistic styles evolved over the course of the Renaissance. Leonardo's is all classical repose. The disciples radiate away from Christ in almost-mathematical symmetry. In the hands of Tintoretto, the same event becomes dramatic, as the human figures are joined by angels. A servant is placed in the foreground, perhaps in reference to the Gospel of John 13:14–16. In the restless dynamism of his composition, his dramatic use of light, and his emphatic perspective effects, Tintoretto seems a baroque artist ahead of his time.

Tintoretto was Venice's most prolific painter of portraits during his career. Modern critics have often described his portraits as routine works, although his skill in depicting elderly men, such as Alvise Cornaro (1560/1565), has been widely admired. According to art historians Robert Echols and Frederick Ilchman, the many portraits from Tintoretto's studio that were executed largely by assistants have hampered appreciation of his autograph portraits which, in sharp contrast to his narrative works, are understated and somber. Lawrence Gowing considered Tintoretto's "smouldering portraits of personalities who seemed consumed by their own fire" to be his "most irresistible" works.

He painted two self-portraits. In the first (c. 1546–1547; Philadelphia Museum of Art), he presents himself without the trappings of status that were customary in self-portraits that came before. The image's informality, the directness of the subject's gaze, and the bold brushwork visible throughout were innovative—it has been called "the first of many artfully unkempt images of the self that have come down through the centuries." The second self-portrait (c. 1588; Louvre) is an austerely symmetrical depiction of the aged artist "bleakly contemplating his mortality". Édouard Manet, who painted a copy of it, considered it "one of the most beautiful paintings in the world."

== Legacy ==
In 2013, the Victoria and Albert Museum announced that the painting The Embarkation of St Helena in the Holy Land had been painted by Tintoretto (and not by his contemporary Andrea Schiavone, as previously thought) as part of a series of three paintings depicting the legend of St Helena and the Holy Cross.

In 2019, honouring the anniversary of the birth of Tintoretto, the National Gallery of Art, Washington, in cooperation with the Gallerie dell'Accademia, organised a travelling exhibit of Tintoretto's work, the first in the United States. The exhibition featured nearly fifty paintings and more than a dozen works on paper spanning the artist's entire career and ranging from regal portraits of Venetian aristocrats to religious and mythological narrative scenes.

== Gallery ==
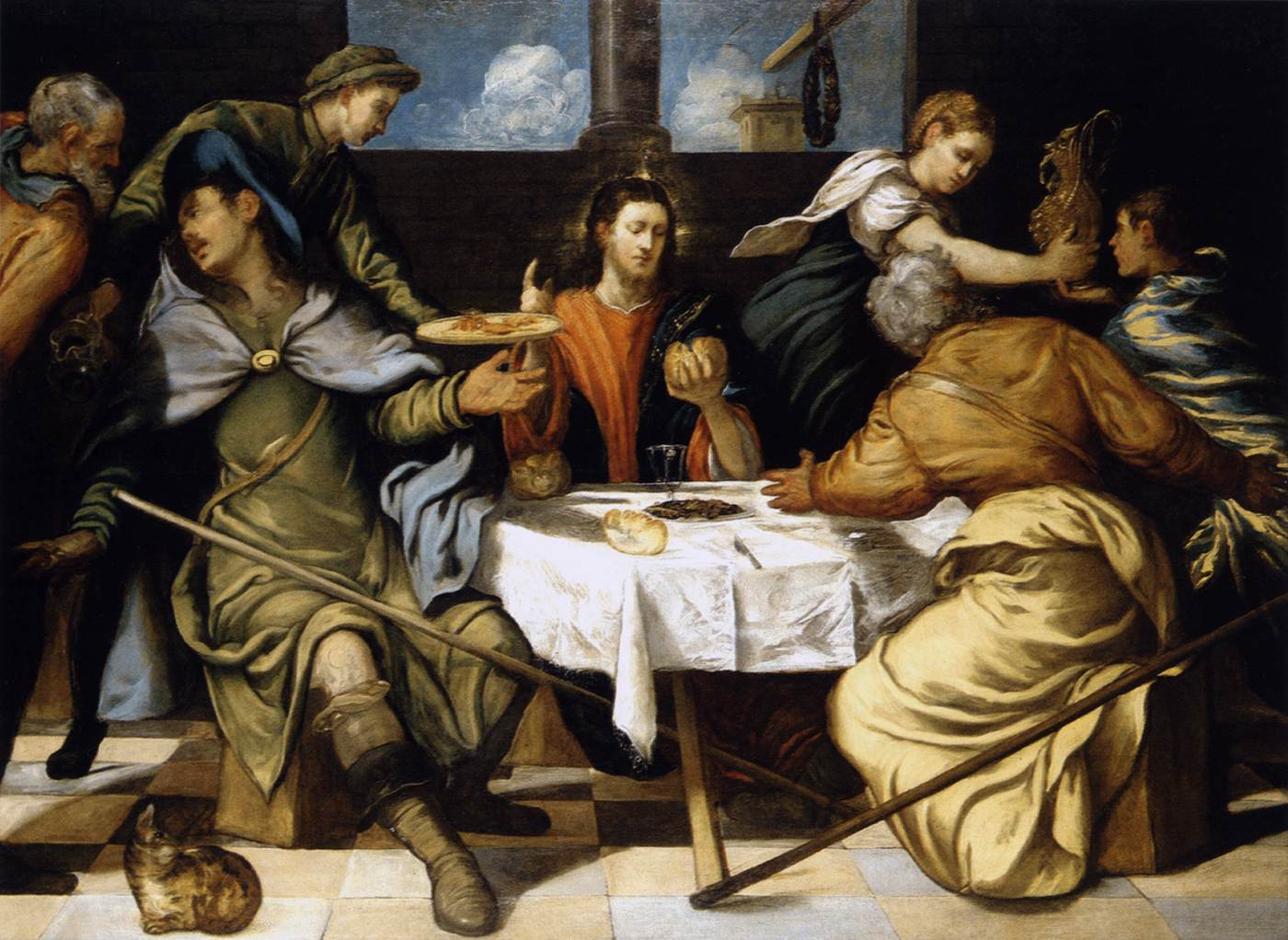
The Supper at Emmaus (1542 or 1543)

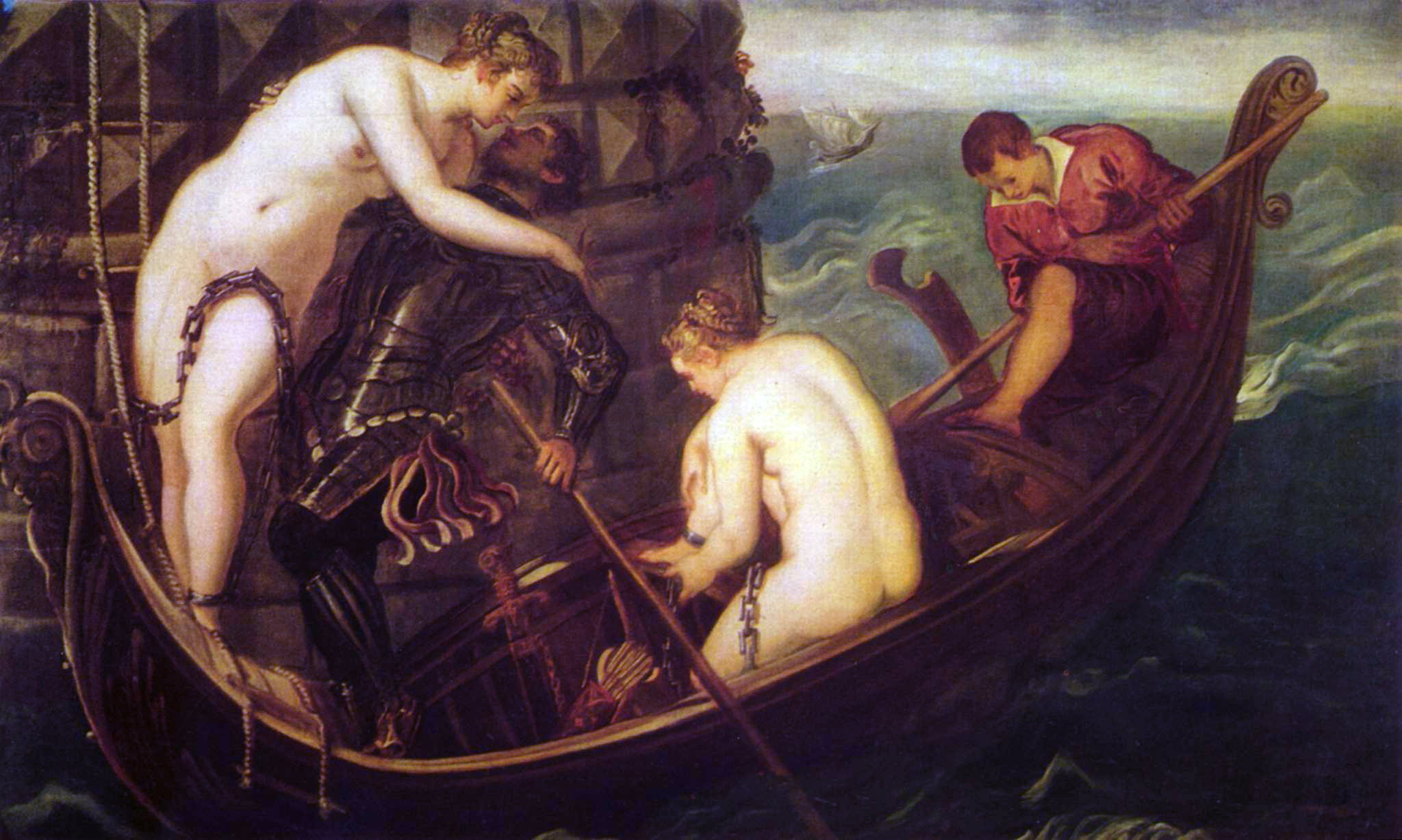
The Deliverance of Arsinoe (c. 1560)

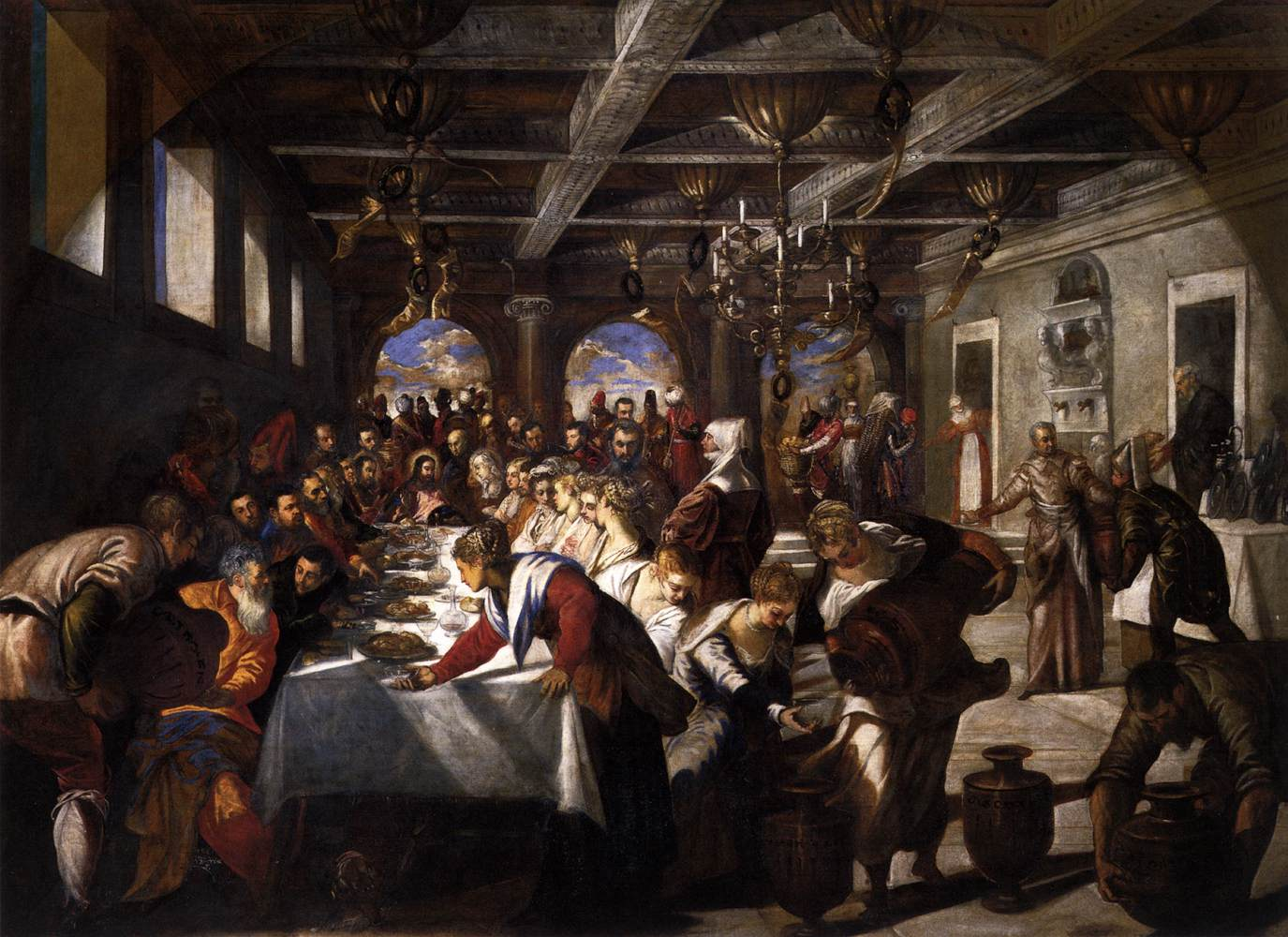
Marriage at Cana (1561), Santa Maria della Salute

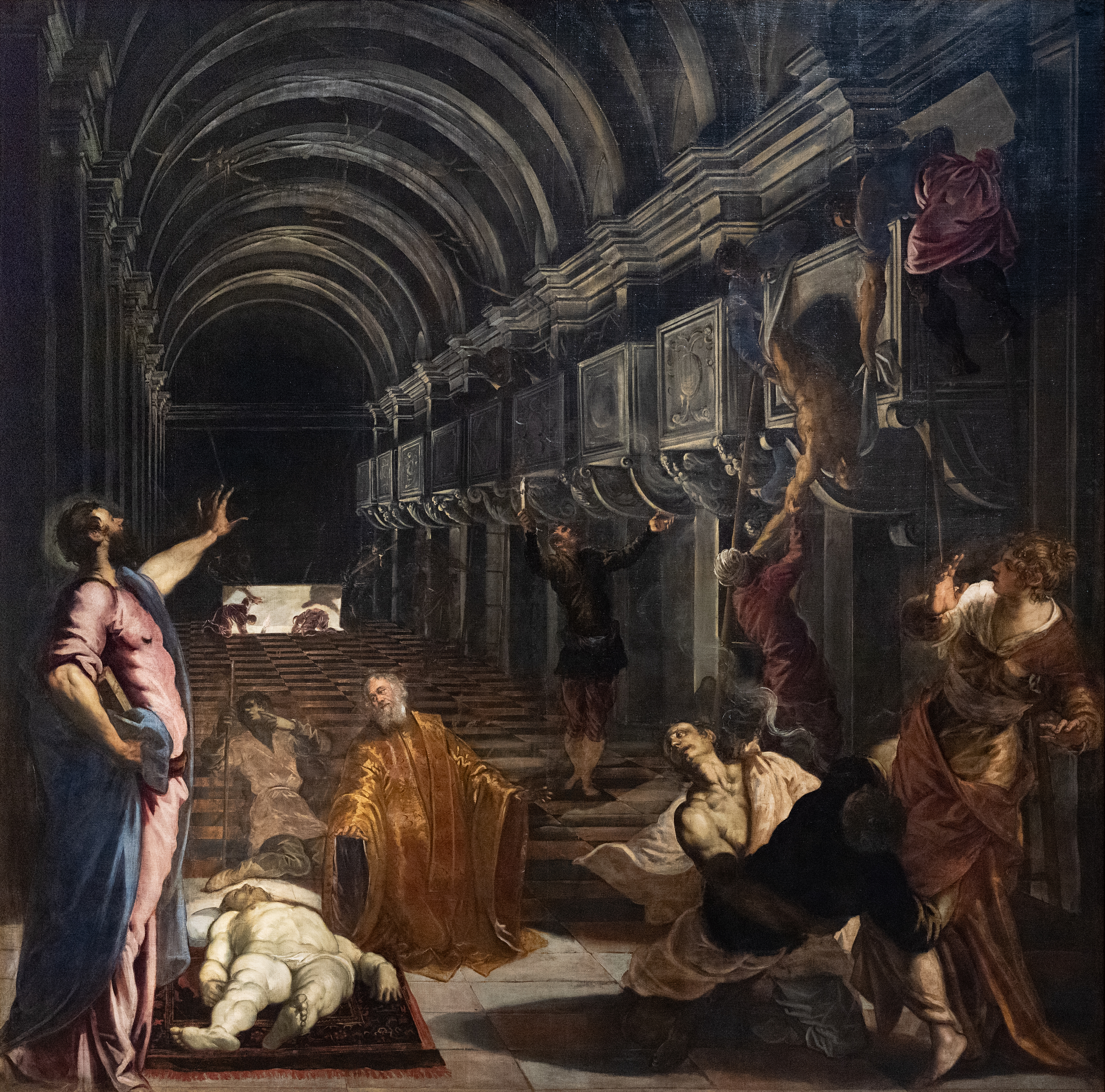
Finding of the body of St Mark (c. 1564), Pinacoteca di Brera

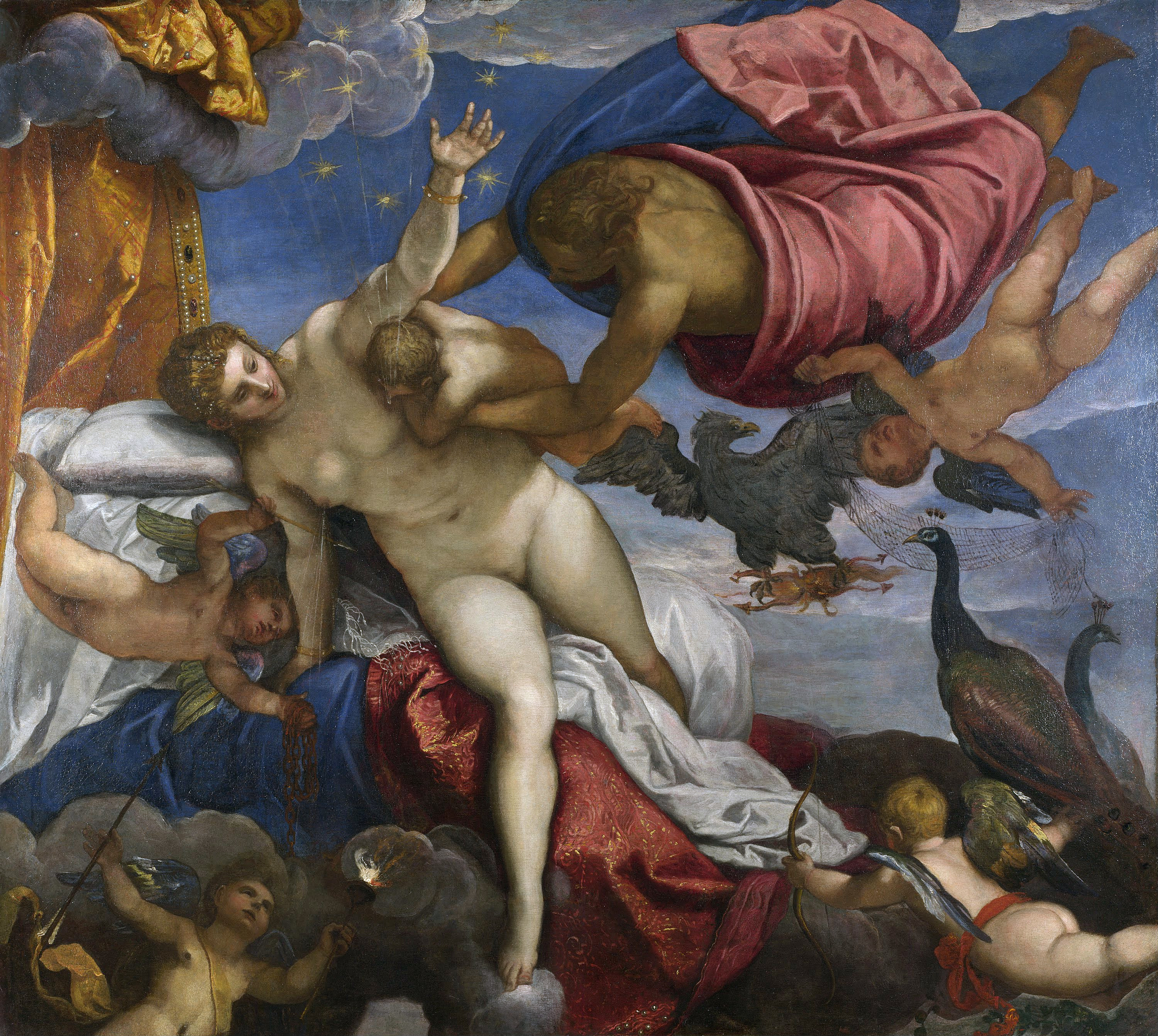
The Origin of the Milky Way (1575)

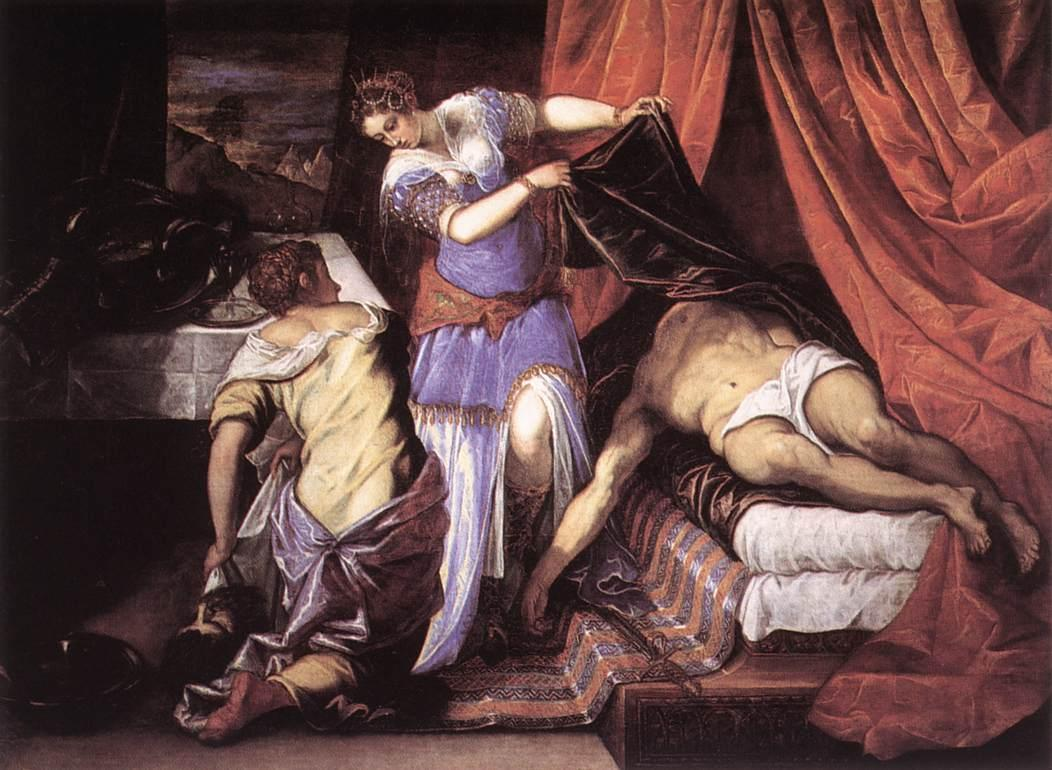
Judith and Holofernes (c. 1577), Prado Museum

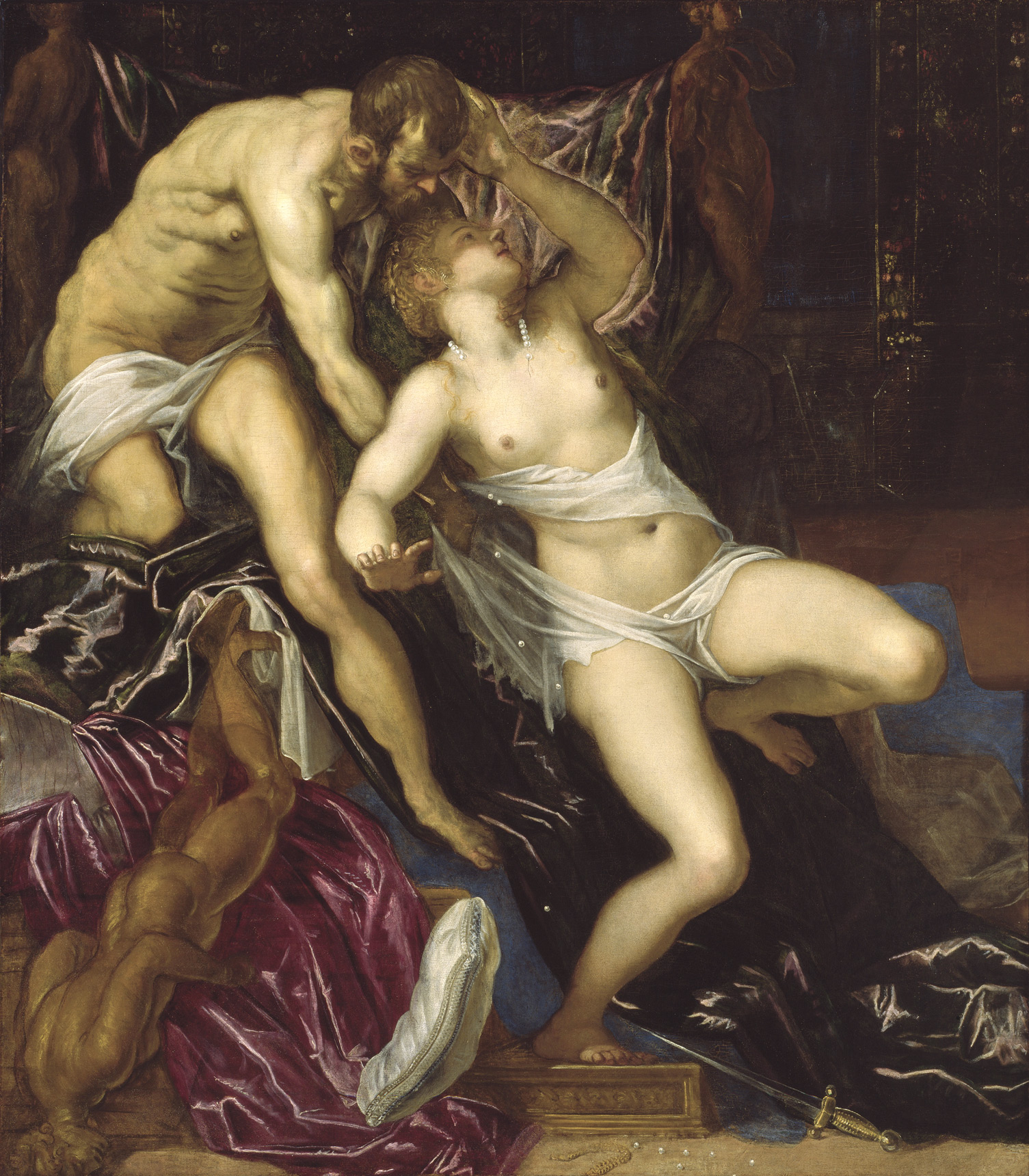
Tarquin and Lucretia (c. 1578), Art Institute of Chicago

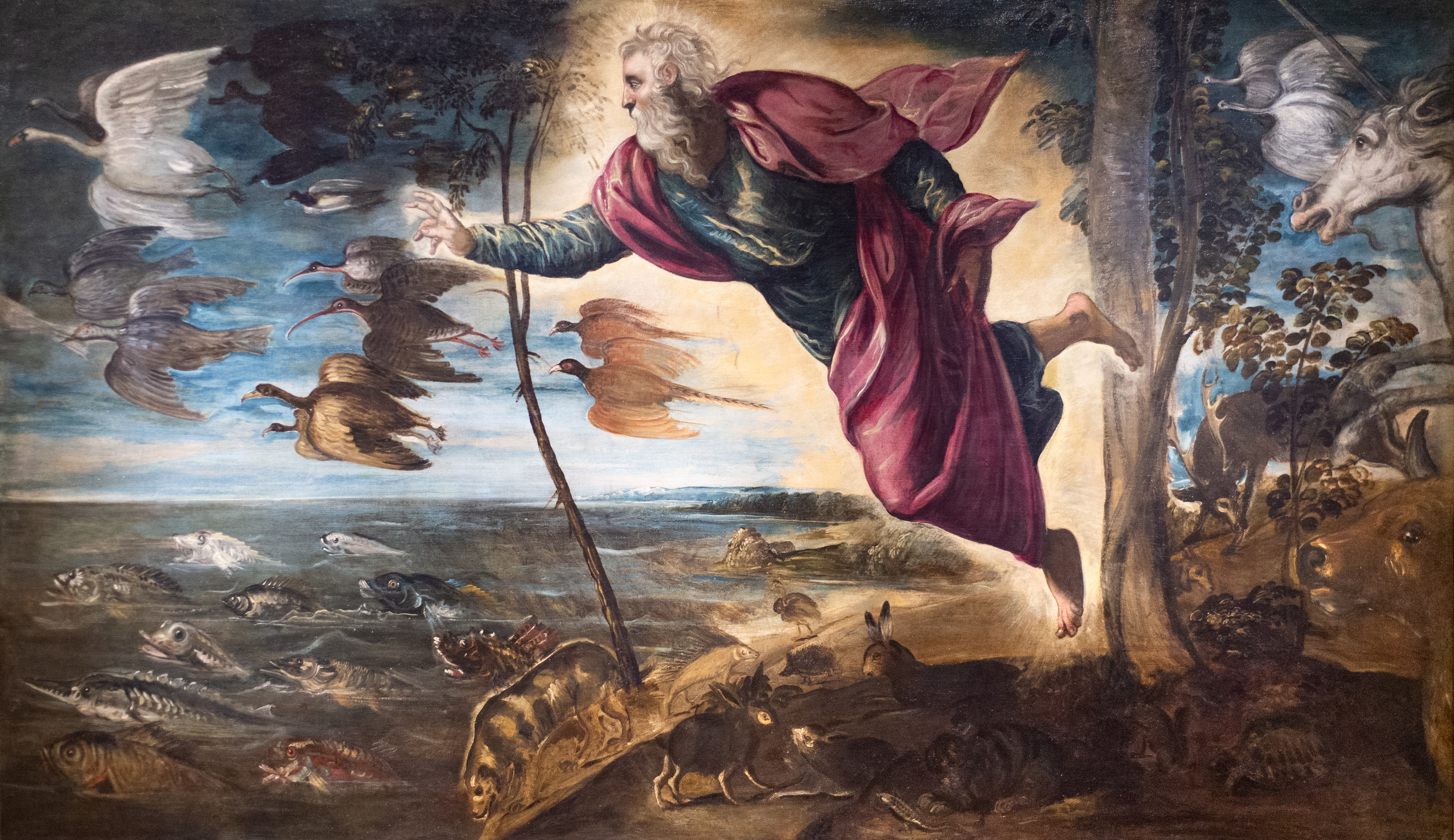
The Creation of the Animals (c. 1551)

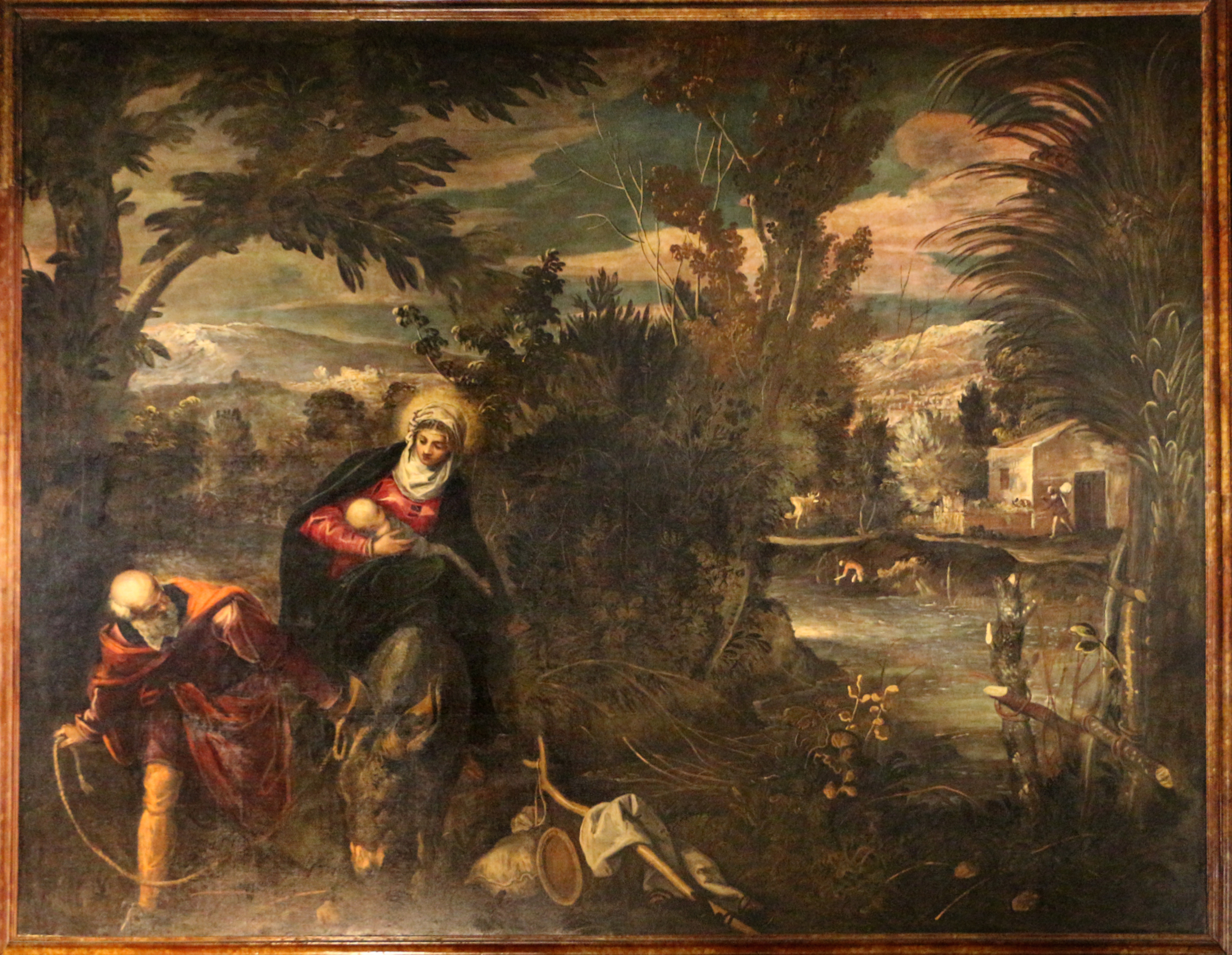
The Flight into Egypt (c. 1582)

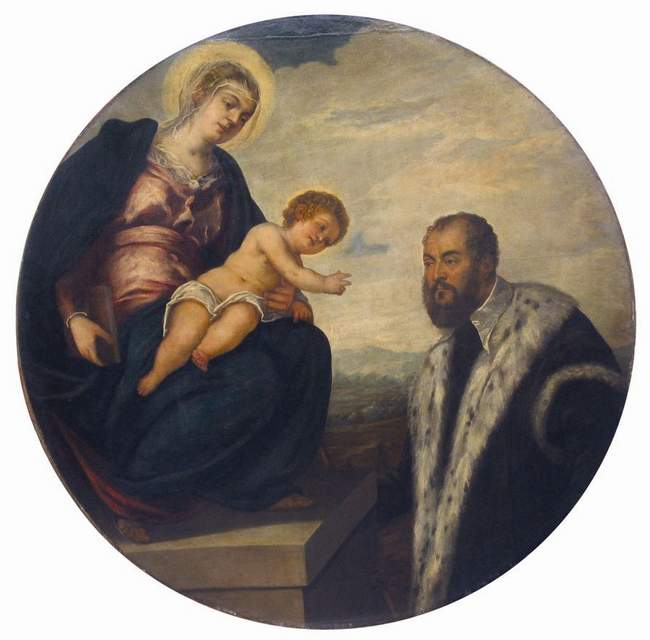
Madonna with Child and Donor, National Museum of Serbia, Belgrade

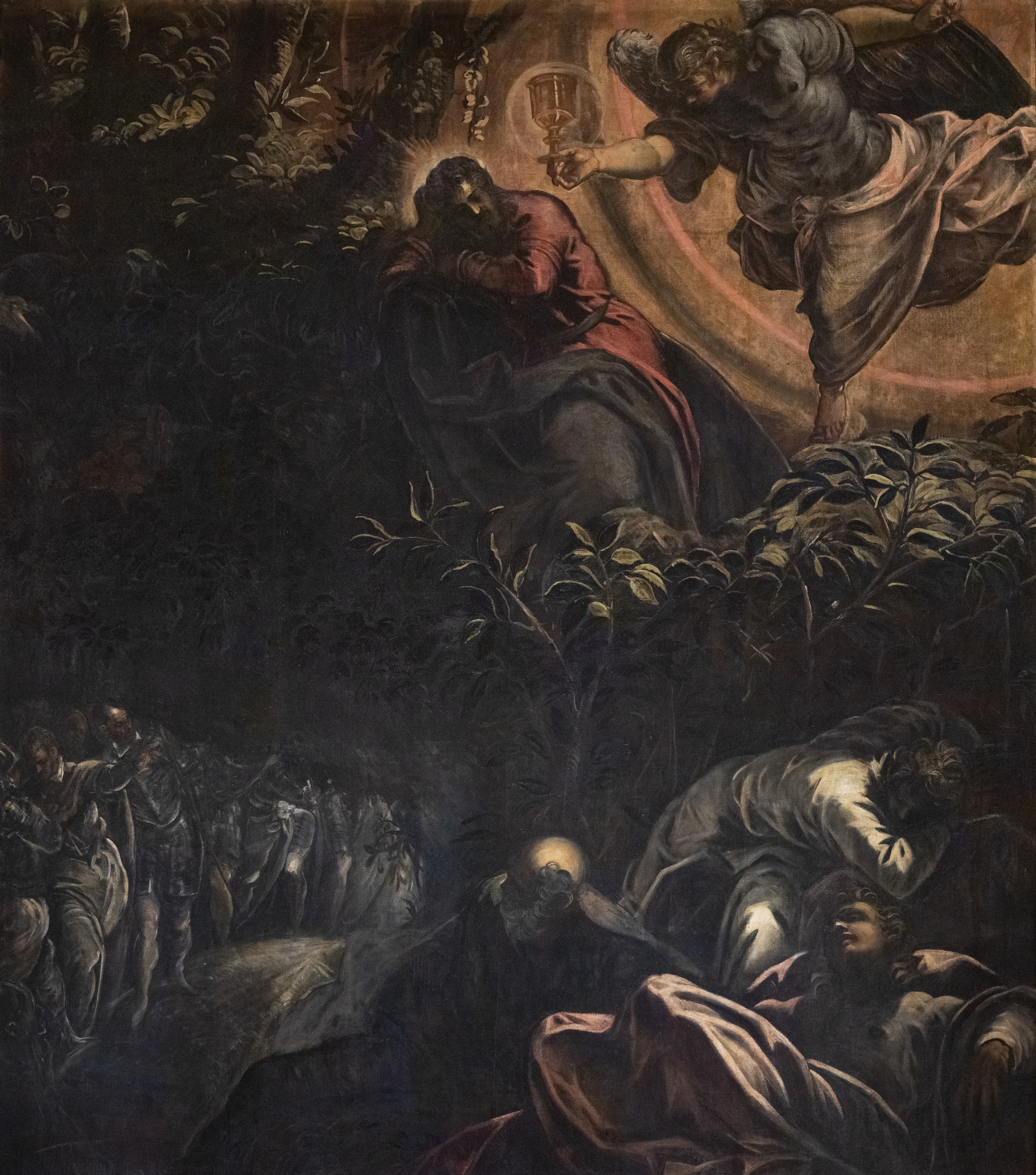
The Prayer in the Garden

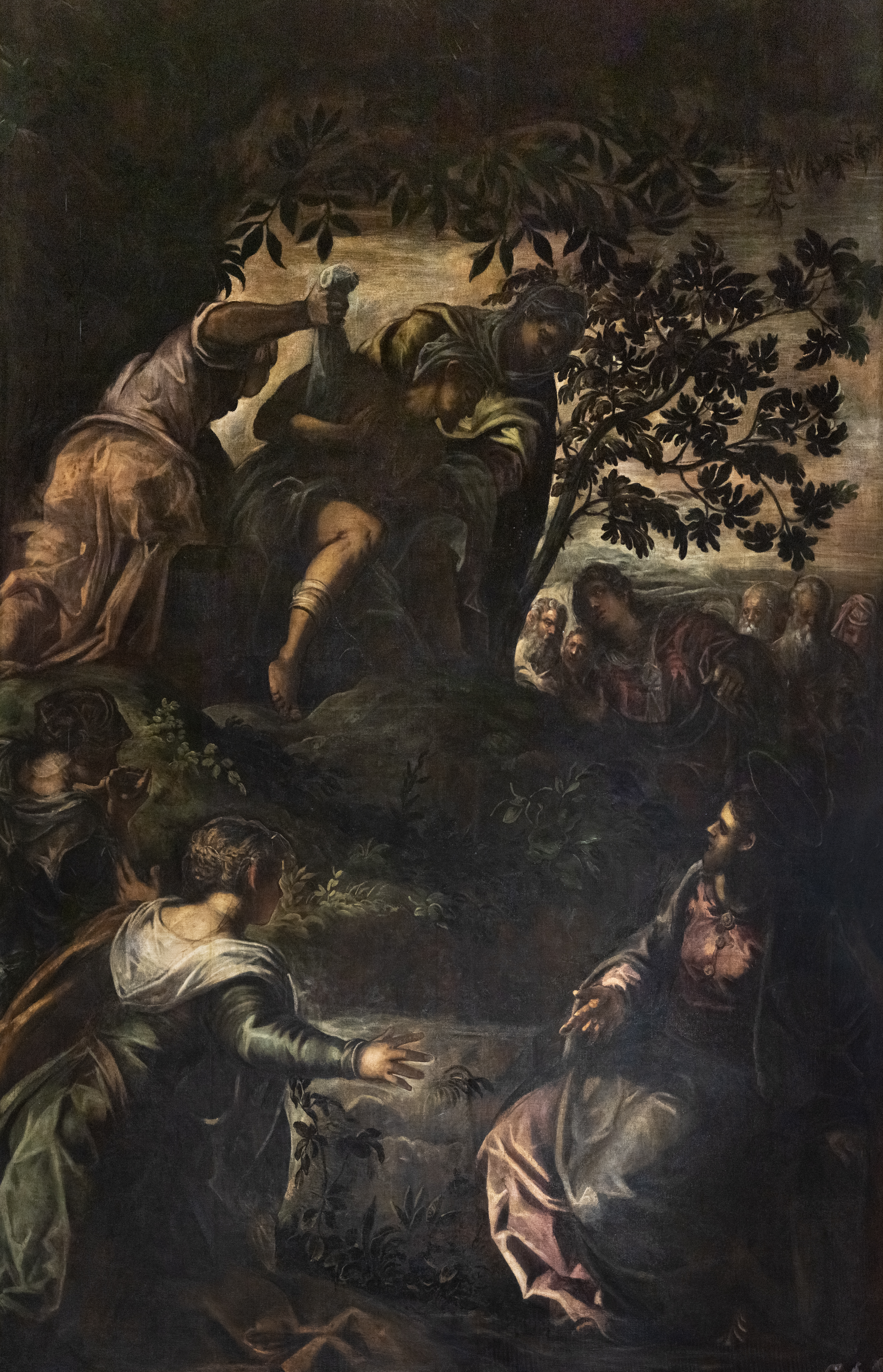
The Raising of Lazarus

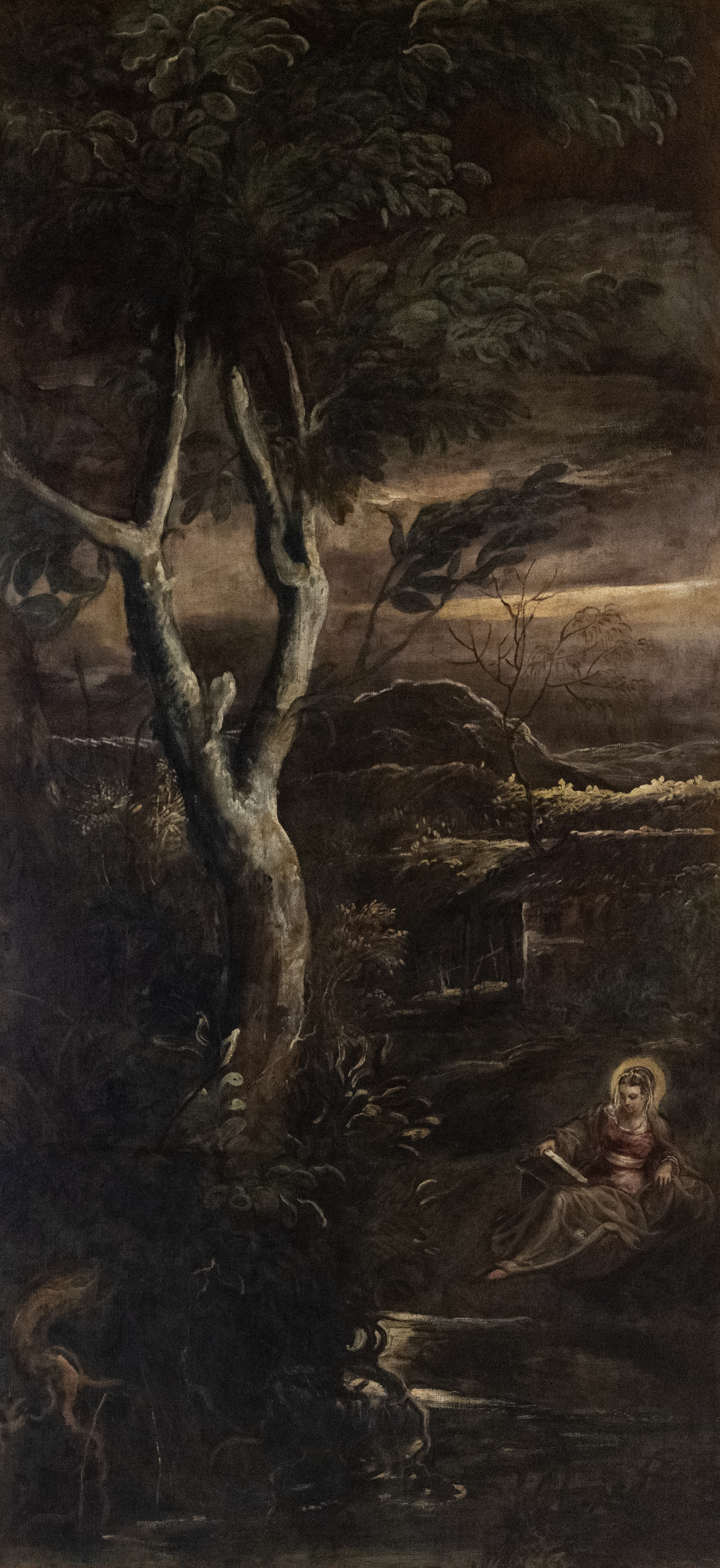
St Mary Magdalen

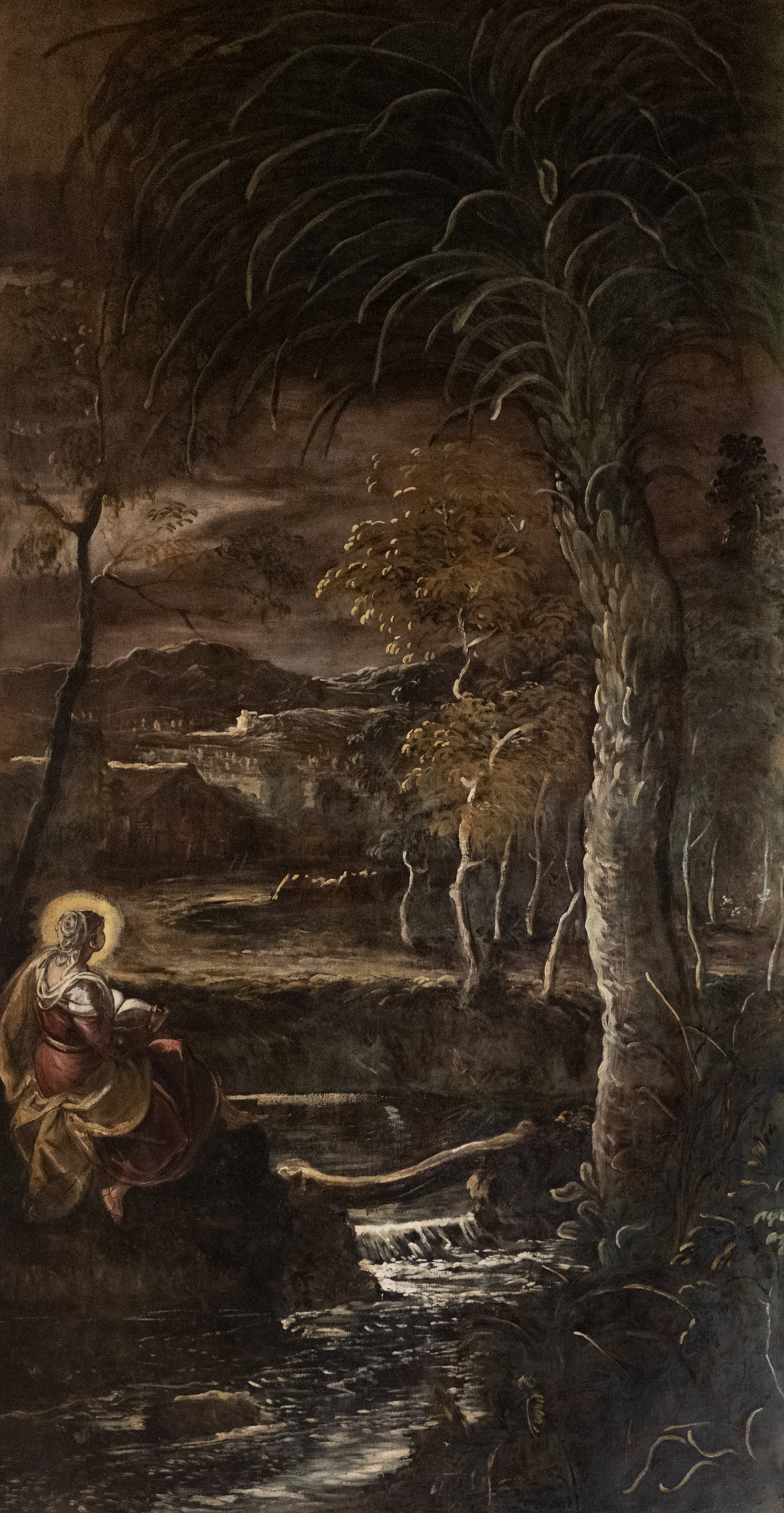
St Mary of Egypt

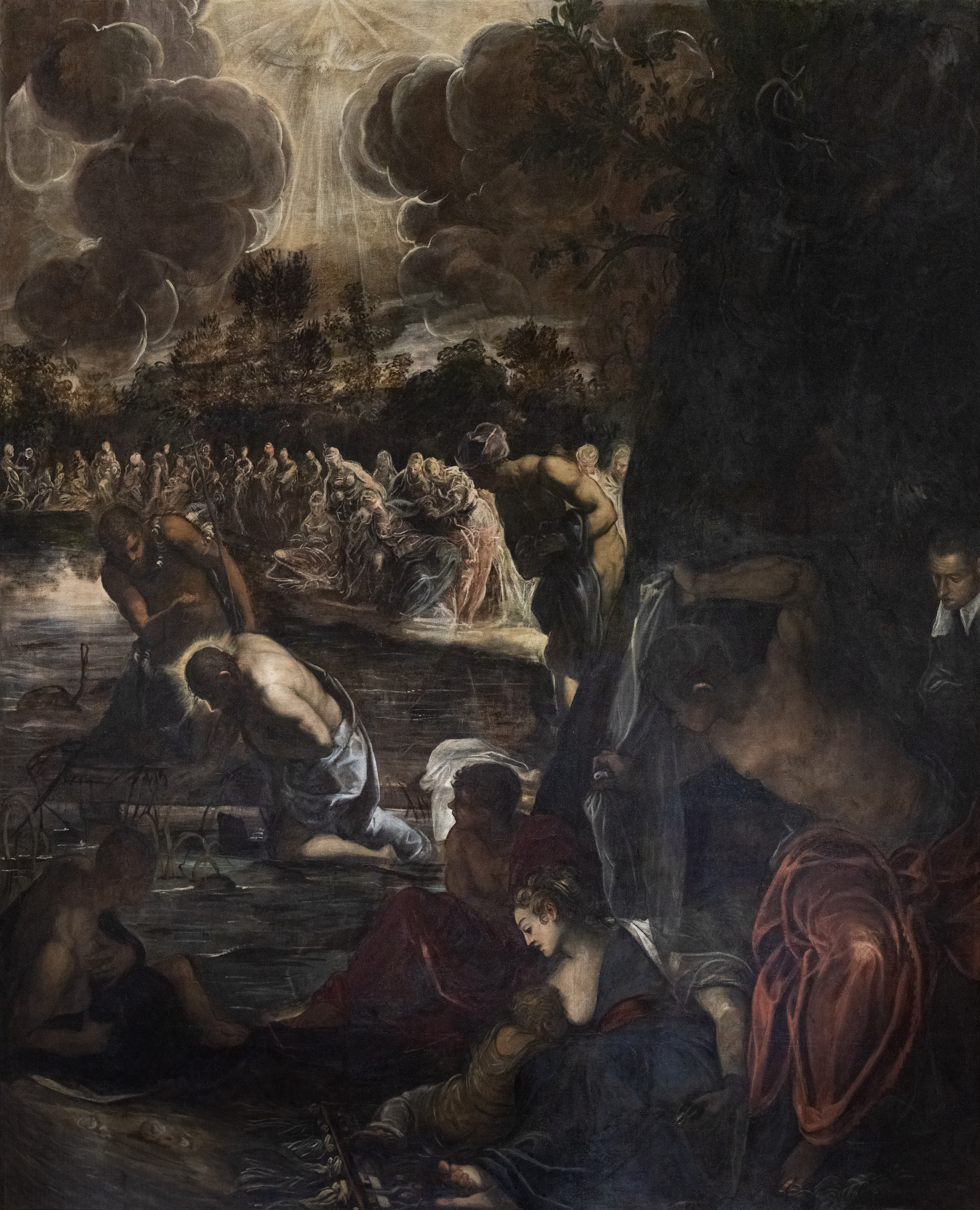
The Baptism of Christ

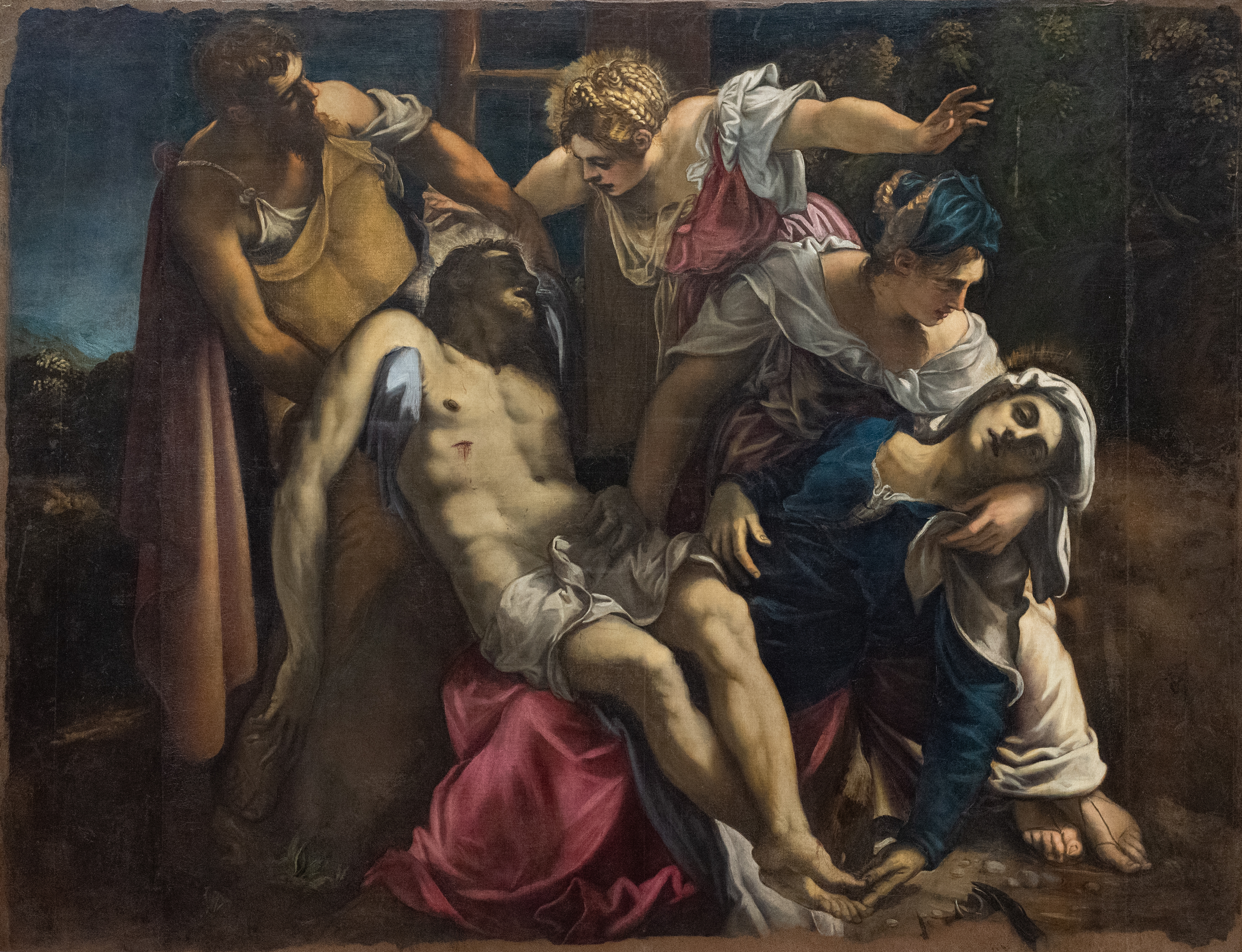
Deposition, 1560

== Bibliography ==
- Bernari, Carlo, and Pierluigi de Vecchi (1970), L'opera completa del Tintoretto, Milano: Rizzoli, OCLC 478839728 (Italian language).
- Butterfield, Andrew (26 April 2007). "Brush with Genius". New York Review of Books. 54 (7). NYREV, Inc.
- Echols, Robert (2018), Tintoretto - Artist of Renaissance Venice, Yale University Press ISBN 9780300230406.
- Nichols, Tom (2015) [1999]. Tintoretto: Tradition and Identity, revised and expanded second edition. London: Reaktion Books ISBN 978 1 78023 450 2.
- Ridolfi, Carlo (1642), La Vita di Giacopo Robusti (A Life of Tintoretto).
- .
