= Scuola Grande di San Marco =

Building in Venice, Italy

Coordinates: 45°26′23″N 12°20′29″E

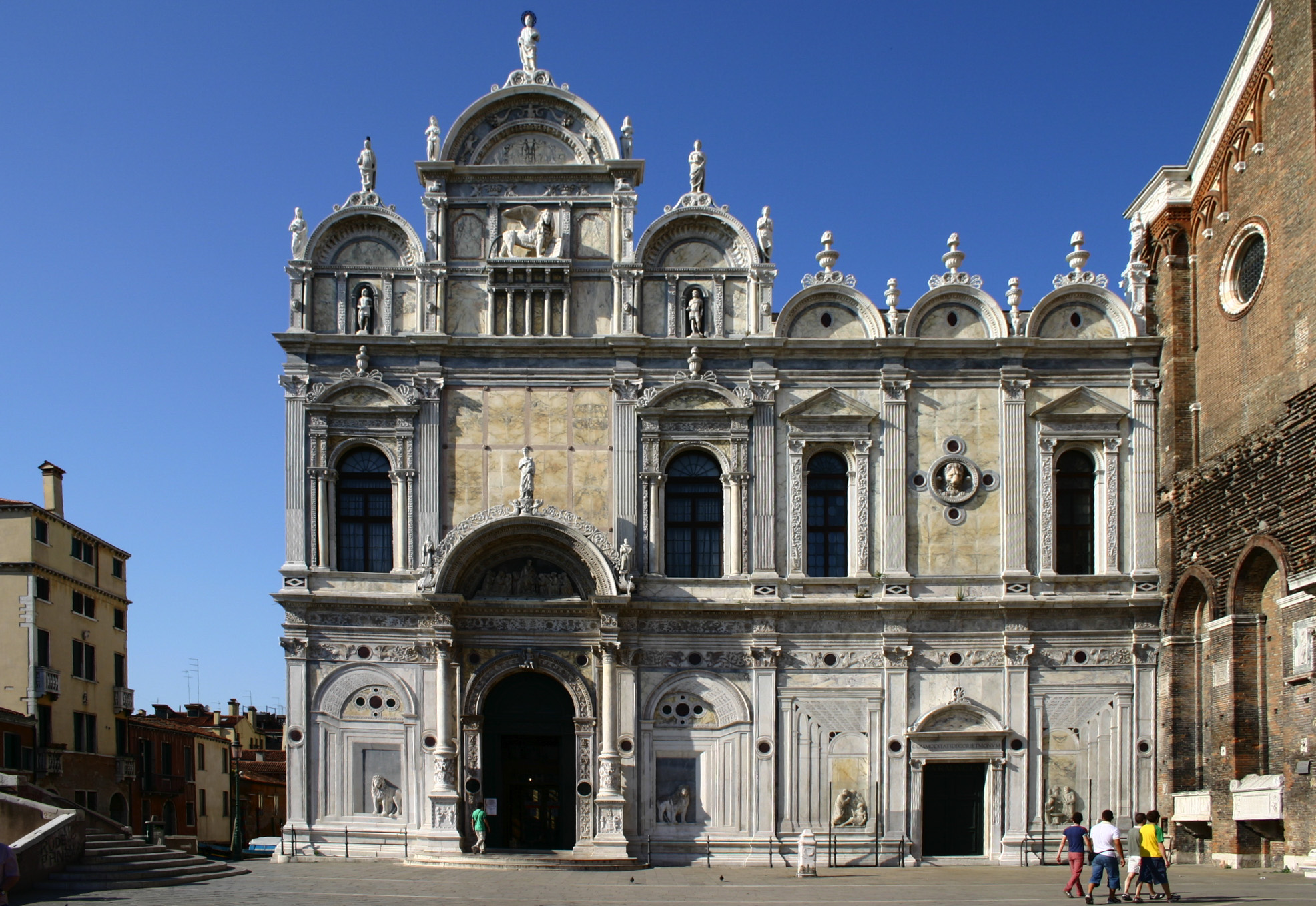
The Scuola Grande of San Marco

The Scuola Grande di San Marco is a building in Venice, Italy, designed by the well-known Venetian architects Pietro Lombardo, Mauro Codussi, and Bartolomeo Bon. It was originally the home to one of the Scuole Grandi of Venice, or seven major confraternities, but is now the city's hospital. It faces the Campo Santi Giovanni e Paolo, one of the largest squares in the city.

== History ==
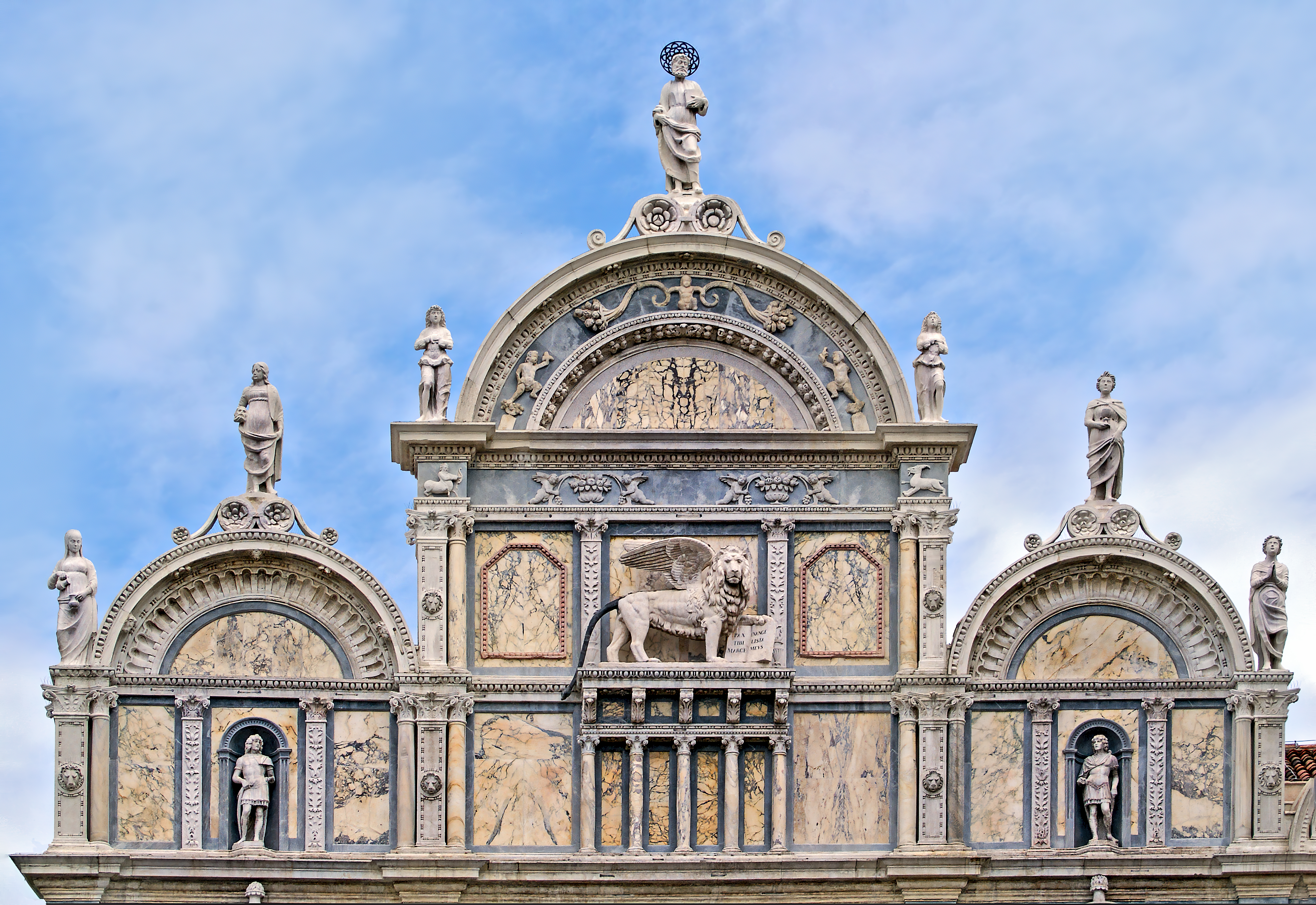
The upper section of the façade

The edifice was built by the Confraternity of San Marco in 1260 to act as its seat. In 1485, however, it was destroyed by a large fire, and rebuilt in the following twenty years under a new design by Pietro Lombardo, with a fund established by the members. The façade, a masterwork with delicately decorated niches and pilasters, and with white or polychrome marble statues, was later completed by Mauro Codussi. While decorated with the polished marble elements of Renaissance classicism, the proliferation of arches and niches adds a retrogressive Byzantine flavor, an architectural feature of many conservative Venetian styles. One of the most notable aspects of the façade is the use of trompe-l'œil archways and portals on the ground floor, all executed in different types of marble. Between 2000 and 2005, the façade underwent conservation treatments funded by Save Venice Inc., the Getty Grant Program, and other donors.

Three of the greatest Italian explorers of the fifteenth century who left records of their travels were members of the Scuola: Ambrogio Contarini, Giosafat Barbaro, and Alvise da Mosto.

Jacopo Tintoretto furnished the Scuola with three paintings Miracle of the Slave (also known as The Miracle of St. Mark, 1548), St Mark's Body Brought to Venice, painted between 1562 and 1566, both paintings are currently housed in the Gallerie dell'Accademia in Venice, and Finding of the body of St Mark also painted between 1562 and 1566, an now held in the Pinacoteca di Brera in Milan. Palma Vecchio also contributed to the cycle with Storm at Sea.

In 1819 it became an Austrian military hospital. It is now a civil hospital.

Since 2013 it is part of the Polo Museale della Scuola Grande di San Marco.
