= Finding of the Body of Saint Mark =

Painting by Tintoretto

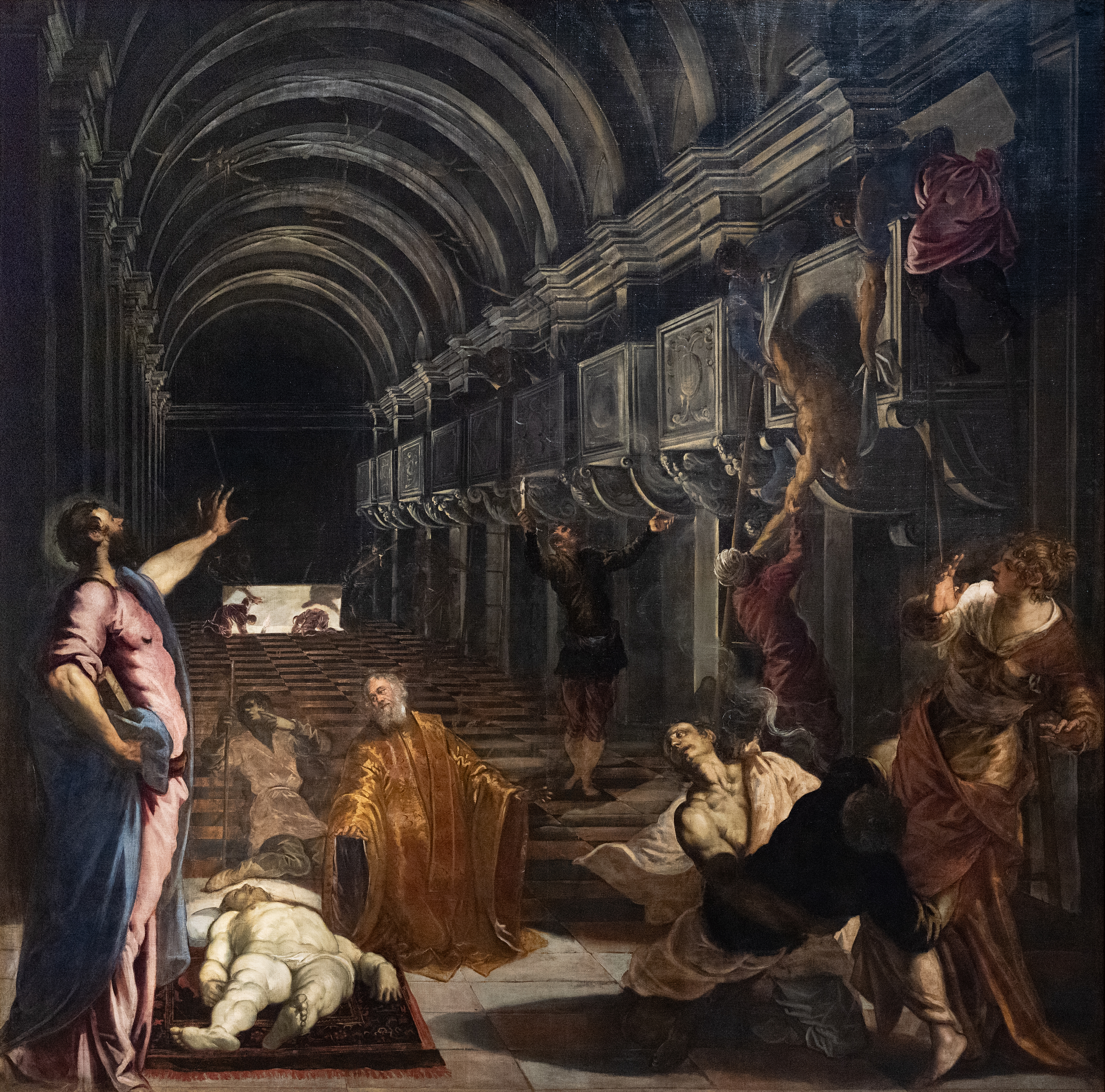
- Artist: Tintoretto
- Year: 1562–1566
- Medium: Oil on canvas
- Dimensions: 405 cm × 405 cm (159 in × 159 in)
- Location: Pinacoteca di Brera; Milan

The Finding of the Body of Saint Mark or Discovery of the Body of Saint Mark is a painting by Tintoretto. Dated to between 1562 and 1566, it is part of a cycle of paintings dedicated to Saint Mark, the patron saint of Venice. It is now held in the Pinacoteca di Brera in Milan.

== Description ==
The painting was commissioned by Tommaso Rangone., the “grand guardian” of the Scuola Grande di San Marco in Venice, from Tintoretto as part of a series of large canvases depicting Venice's acquisition of the body of Saint Mark.

The subject is traditionally known as Finding of the body of Saint Mark, but actually it is the Miracles of Saint Mark in the church of Boucolis in Alexandria. The same scene was already sculpted by Jacopo Sansovino in the reliefs for the St. Mark's Basilica. The saint is represented alive, with his feet on the ground, unlike the other post-mortem scenes in which he appears in flight, according to the common iconographic conventions relating to the stories of the saints. The error was originated by Carlo Ridolfi, in his Le Maraviglie dell'arte (1648), where he wrote "il modo tenuto nel levare il corpo di san Marco".

Saint Mark is depicted curing the sick, resurrecting the dead and exorcising a man. In the center of the canvas, an elder kneels (the portrait of Tommaso Rangone), acknowledging the miracles.

In places, the work appears unfinished (e.g. the tiles of floor and the cornices are still visible through some clothing and figures). The foreshortening is accentuated by the tiles, the wall tombs, and finally the rays of light that emerge from the crypt in the background. In the right foreground, a contorted half-naked man is described as "possessed by demons", and above him hover strands of smoke.

Like its companion piece, Saint Mark's Body Brought to Venice, the composition exemplifies Tintoretto's preference for dramatic effects of perspective and light. According to the art historian Thomas Nichols, "the linear logic of the emptied, boxlike perspective vistas is undermined by an irrational play of light and shade. Both paintings suggest the simultaneous existence of different levels of reality through the use of a range of pictorial techniques."

According to art historian Augusto Gentili, the iconography of the painting suggests that it represents not the finding of the body of Saint Mark, but Miracles of Saint Mark in the church of Boucolis in Alexandria.
