= Miracle of the Slave (Tintoretto) =

1548 painting by Jacopo Tintoretto

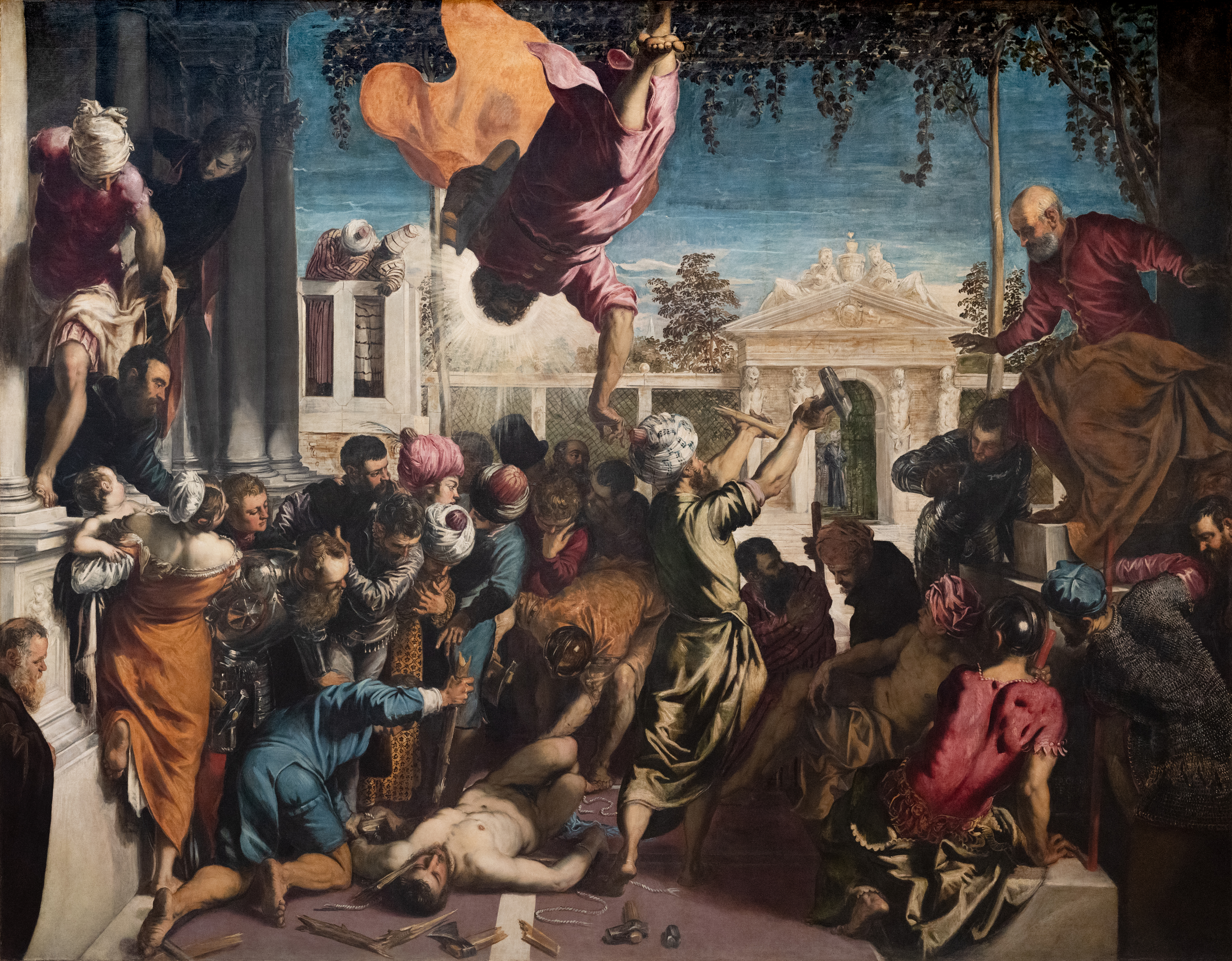
- Artist: Tintoretto
- Year: 1548
- Medium: Oil on canvas
- Dimensions: 416 cm × 544 cm (164 in × 214 in)
- Location: Gallerie dell'Accademia; Venice

The Miracle of the Slave (also known as The Miracle of St. Mark) is a painting completed in 1548 by the Italian Renaissance artist Jacopo Tintoretto. Originally commissioned for the Scuola Grande di San Marco, a confraternity in the city of Venice, the work has been held in the Gallerie dell'Accademia since 1815.

The painting portrays Saint Mark, patron saint of Venice, performing a posthumous miracle of saving a slave from torture. Drawn from hagiographic sources on the saint’s life, like Jacobus de Voragine's Golden Legend and Jacopo Sansovino's bronze reliefs, Saint Mark appears at the top of the image after being summoned by the slave, destroying the tools used in his torture and stunning the crowd.

Miracle of the Slave has been described as Tintoretto’s public consecration in Venice, and has classic components of the Venetian school of art along with themes that would become prevalent throughout the artist's career.

== Description ==
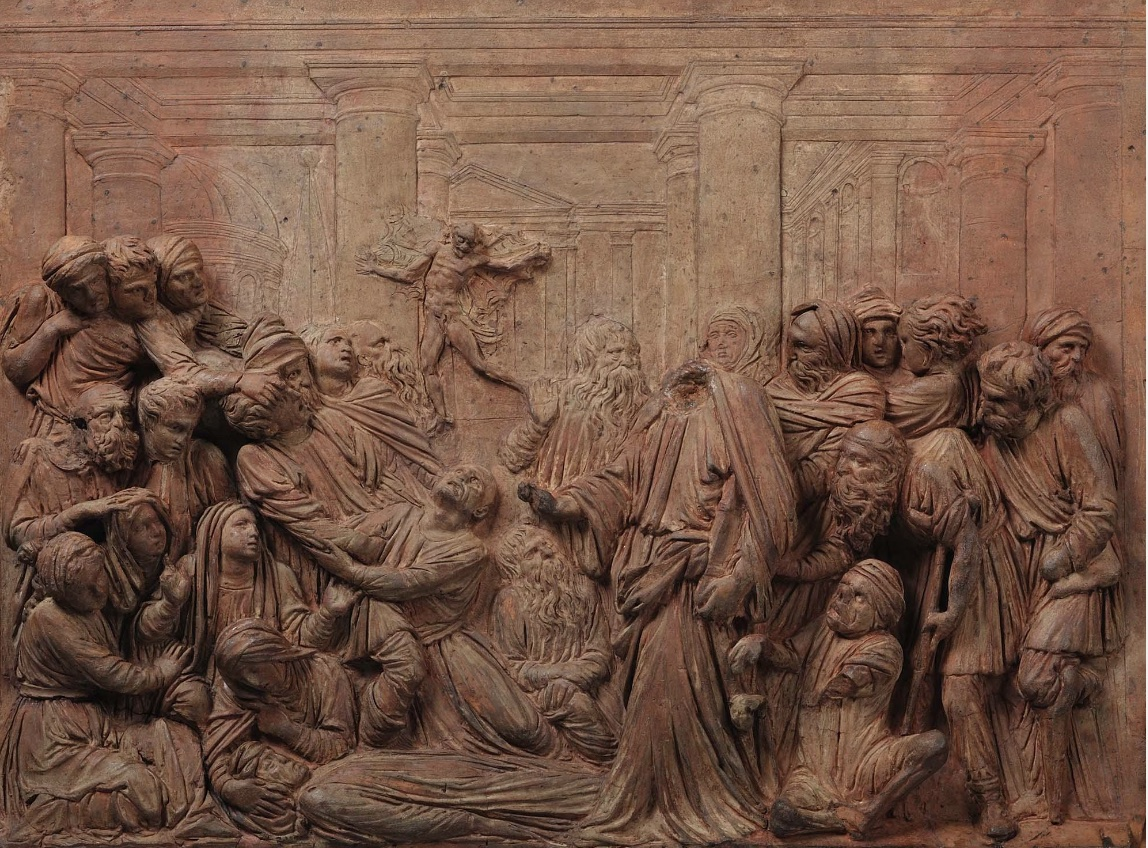
The bronze relief by Jacopo Sansovino of St. Mark driving away a demon, often cited as inspiration for Tintoretto's work

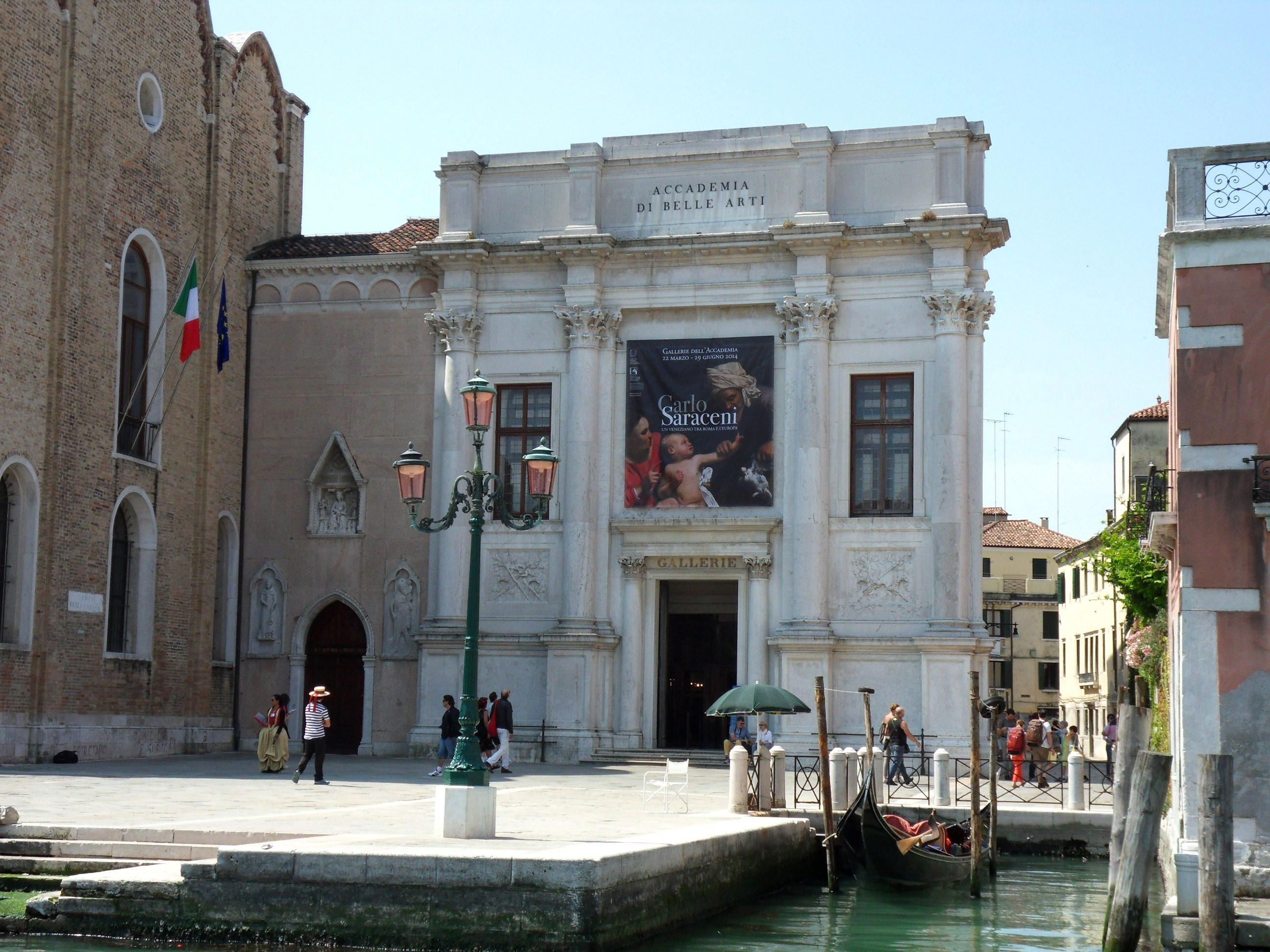
The Gallerie dell'Accademia di Venezia, where the work has been since 1815

Miracle of the Slave was commissioned by the charitable civic organization of the Scuola Grande di San Marco to hang opposite the altar within the building. The work hung in the Scuola until seized by the French in 1797. It was then returned to Venice in its current location at the Gallerie dell'Accademia in 1815.

The image tells the hagiography of a slave who lived long after the life of St. Mark, using fellow Venetian artist Jacopo Sansovino's bronze relief created for the pulpit in St. Mark's Basilica as inspiration. Prior to the events shown in the picture, the slave wants to visit the tomb of the patron saint of Venice, but his master forbids his visit. The slave makes the pilgrimage against his master's will, and devotes his body to St. Mark upon reaching the tomb. The painting shows the slave's arrival back at his master's residence, when his master punishes him. The master, seated at the throne on the right, calls for the slave's eyes to be gouged out, legs to be broken, and mouth to be shattered. However, the instruments of torture continue breaking next to the slave as he calls for St. Mark, who appears at the top of the composition. Stunned, the crowd on the left side of the picture is convinced of a miracle.

Miracle of the Slave is a classic example of a work from the Venetian school. The piece is daring in its use of color to organize its composition. In particular, the juxtaposition of depth created by the vibrant pink of the garb of St. Mark contrasted with the brilliant white turban below him creates a sense of depth that makes the figure of the saint stand out in the air.

== Context ==
Miracle of the Slave was the first notable work of Tintoretto's career. Prior to Miracle of the Slave, Tintoretto did not have powerful backers. The artist was continually told his brushwork was too rushed and works were unfinished. In particular, the famous Venetian painter Titian was an open critic of Tintoretto’s work to this point.

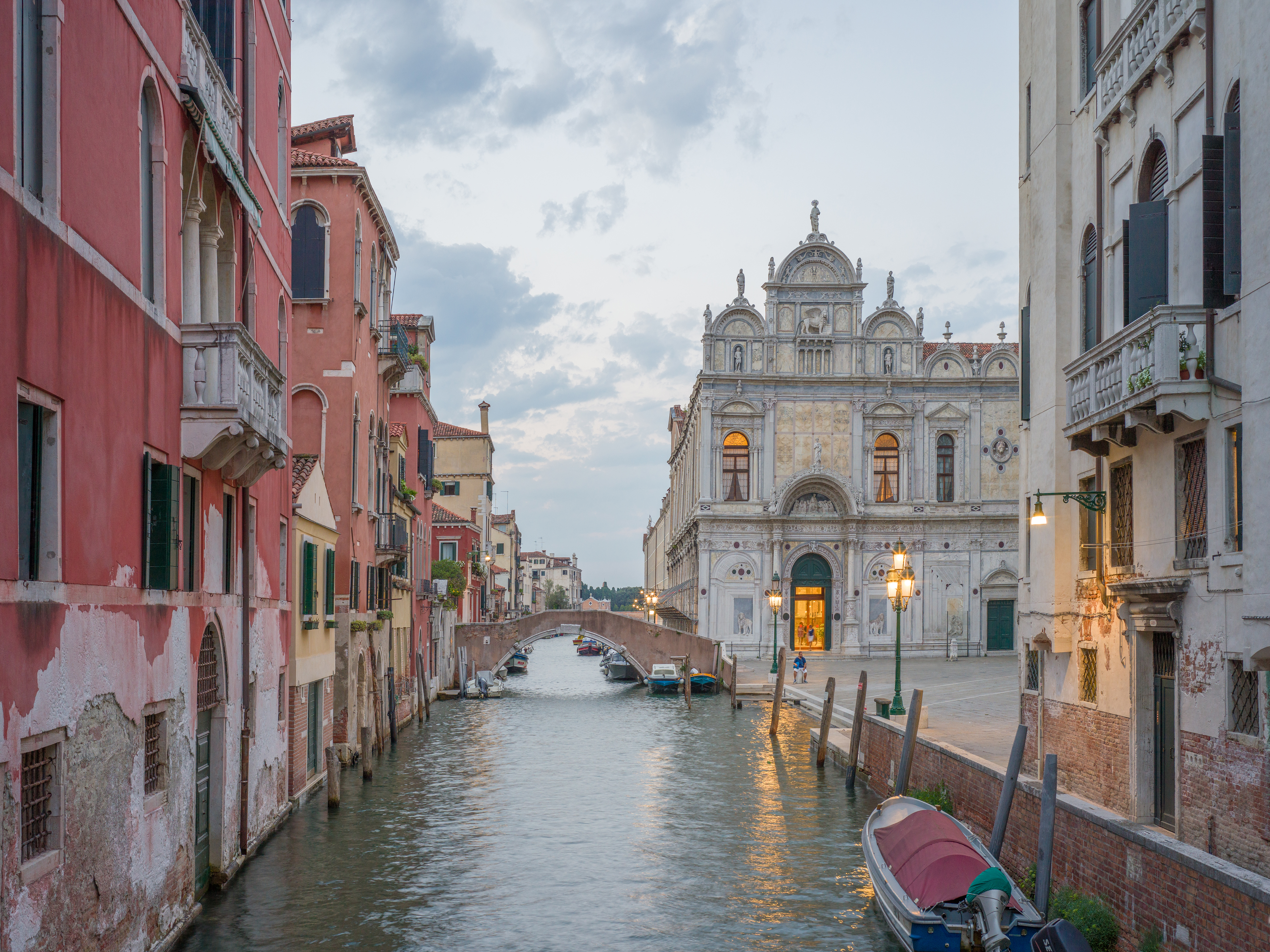
The Scuola di San Marco in Venice, Italy

Miracle of the Slave was, from the beginning, the biggest commission Tintoretto had received. The confraternity that paid for the work, the Scuola di San Marco, was the largest and wealthiest lay organization in Venice, and it played a central role in social life. However, the work was not met with immediate success; some members of the confraternity originally insisted the painting be returned to Tintoretto. Various theories exist as to the cause of the dispute over the work, ranging from Tintoretto's personality to favoritism from Tintoretto's father-in-law, who held a leadership position within the Scuola Grande di San Marco. Ultimately, though, Miracle of the Slave was met with praise and led to numerous new commissions from Tintoretto.

== Interpretation ==
Interpretations of the painting have focused on its religious content. Contemporary biographer Carlo Ridolfi wrote that Tintoretto changed the course of religious painting in Venice, as everyone after him painted scenes with the "great strength and energy used that he expressed through his figures." More recently, authors have placed Miracle of the Slave at the beginning of Tintoretto's exploration of miraculous intervention, which he often depicted in other works in Venice.

== Gallery ==
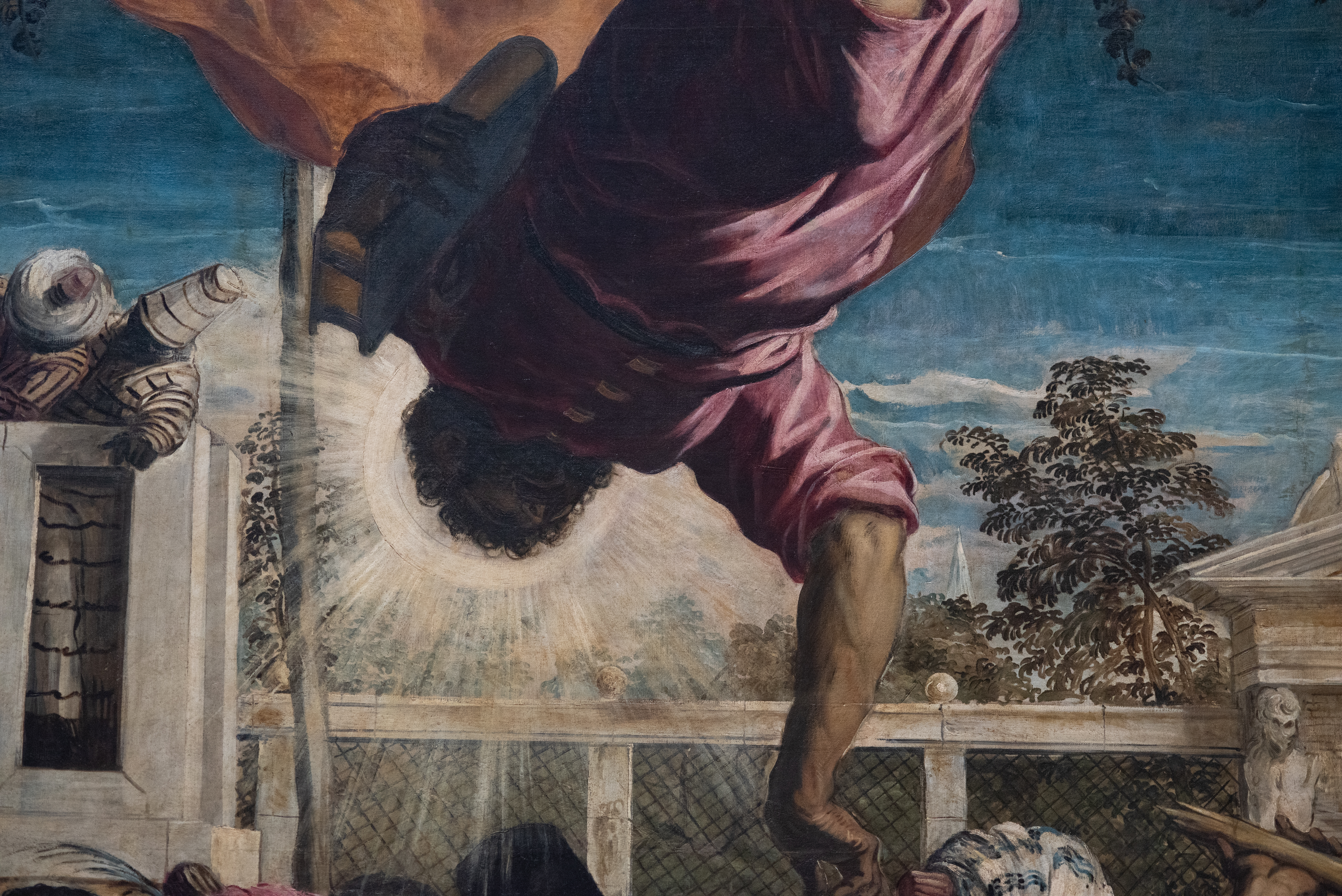
Saint Mark

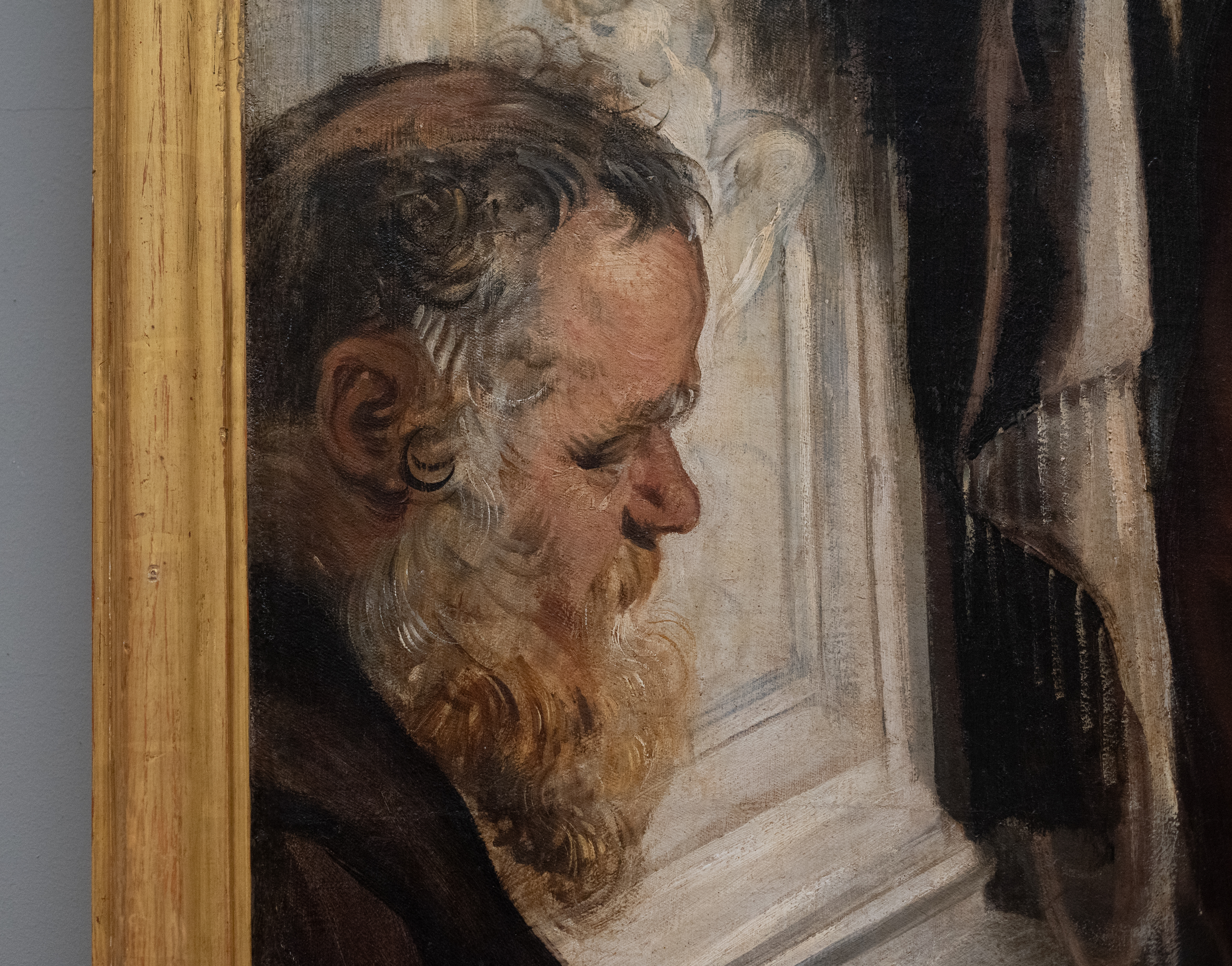
The commissioner

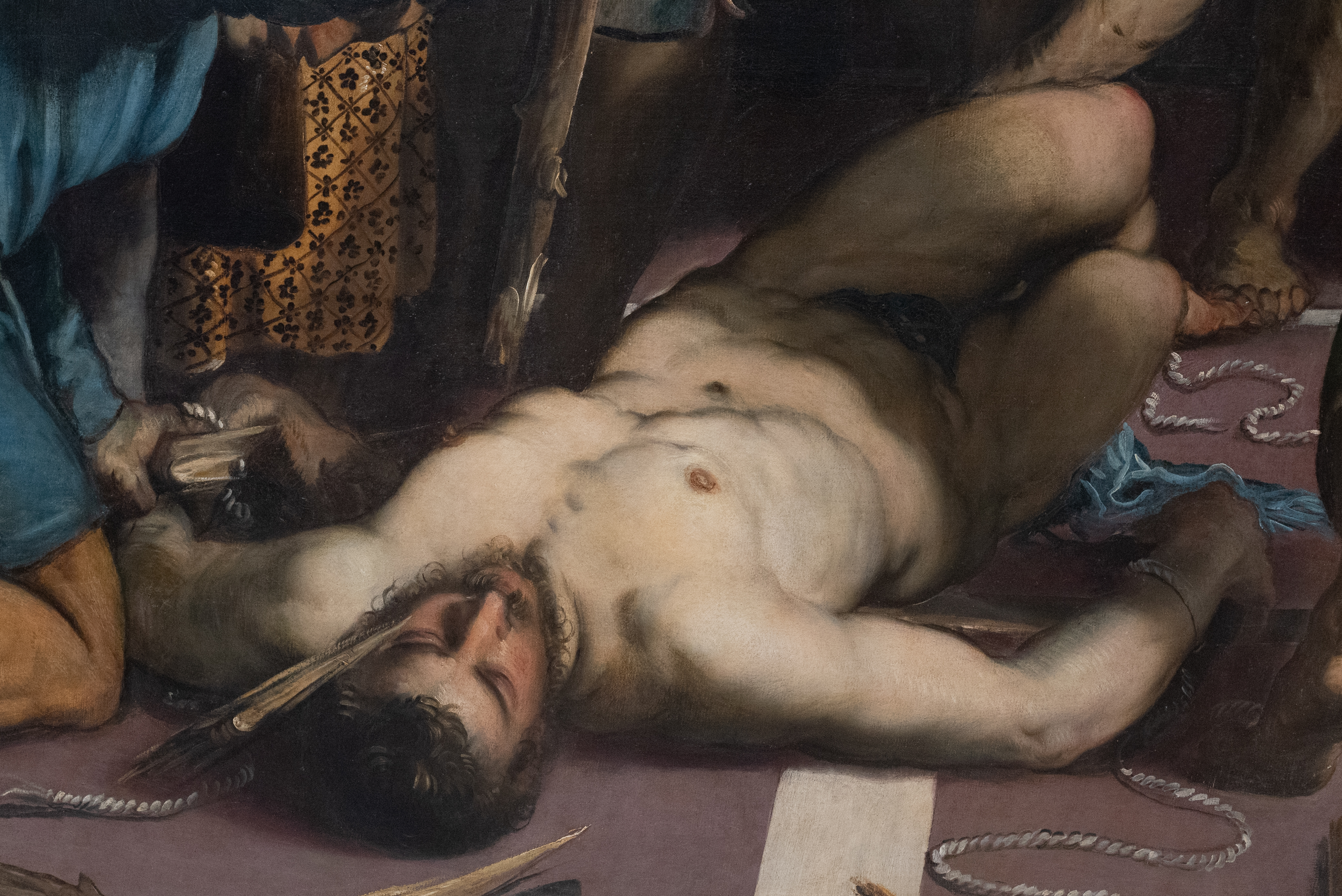
The fallen slave

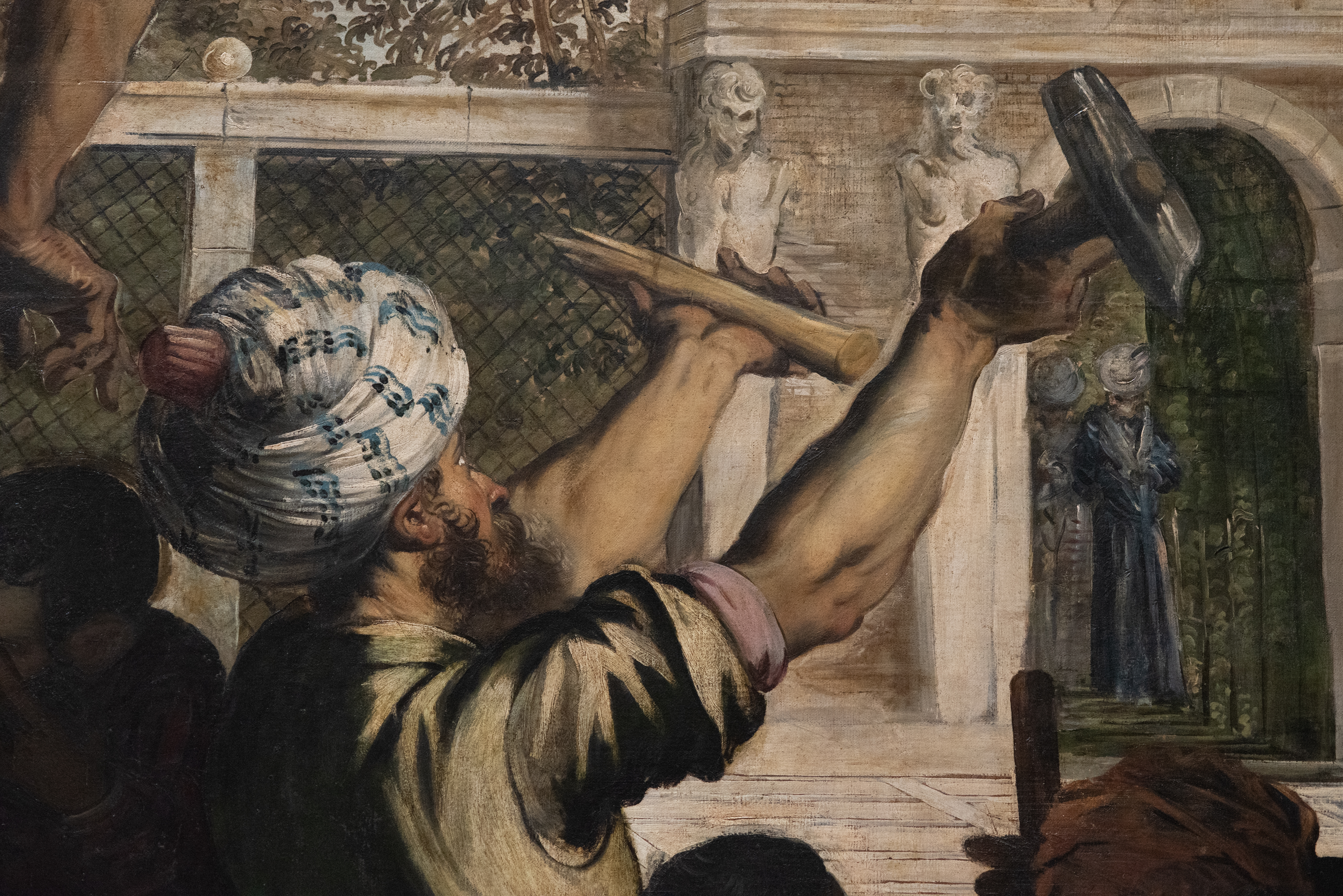
The broken weapon
