= Venetian painting =

Art from the Republic of Venice

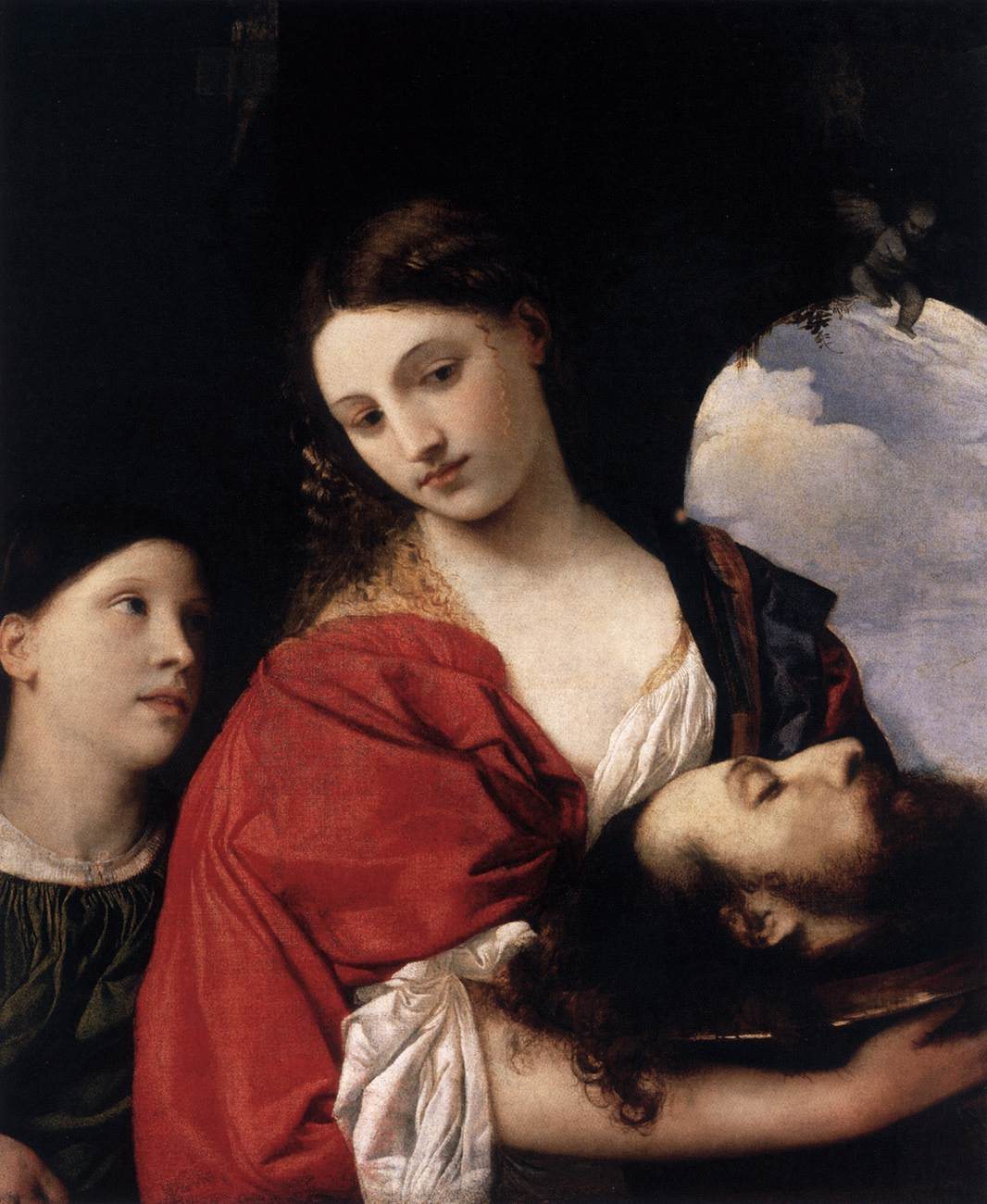
Titian, Salome with the Head of John the Baptist c. 1515; this religious work also functions as an idealized portrait of a beauty, a Venetian genre developed by Titian, supposedly often using Venetian courtesans as models.

Venetian painting was a major force in Italian Renaissance painting and beyond. Beginning with the work of Giovanni Bellini (c. 1430–1516) and his brother Gentile Bellini (c. 1429–1507) and their workshops, the major artists of the Venetian school included Giorgione (c. 1477–1510), Titian (c. 1489–1576), Tintoretto (1518–1594), Paolo Veronese (1528–1588) and Jacopo Bassano (1510–1592) and his sons. Considered to give primacy to colour over line, the tradition of the Venetian school contrasted with the Mannerism prevalent in the rest of Italy. The Venetian style exerted great influence upon the subsequent development of Western painting.

By chance, the main phases of Venetian painting fit rather neatly into the centuries. The glories of the 16th century were followed by a great fall-off in the 17th, but an unexpected revival in the 18th, when Venetian painters enjoyed great success around Europe, as Baroque painting turned to Rococo. This had ended completely by the extinction of the Republic of Venice in 1797 and since then, though much painted by others, Venice has not had a continuing style or tradition of its own.

Though a long decline in the political and economic power of the Republic began before 1500, Venice at that date remained "the richest, most powerful, and most populous Italian city" and controlled significant territories on the mainland, known as the terraferma, which included several small cities who contributed artists to the Venetian school, in particular Padua, Bergamo, Brescia and Verona. The Republic's territories also included Istria, Dalmatia and the islands now off the Croatian coast, who also contributed. Indeed, "the major Venetian painters of the sixteenth century were rarely natives of the city" itself, and some mostly worked in the Republic's other territories, or further afield.

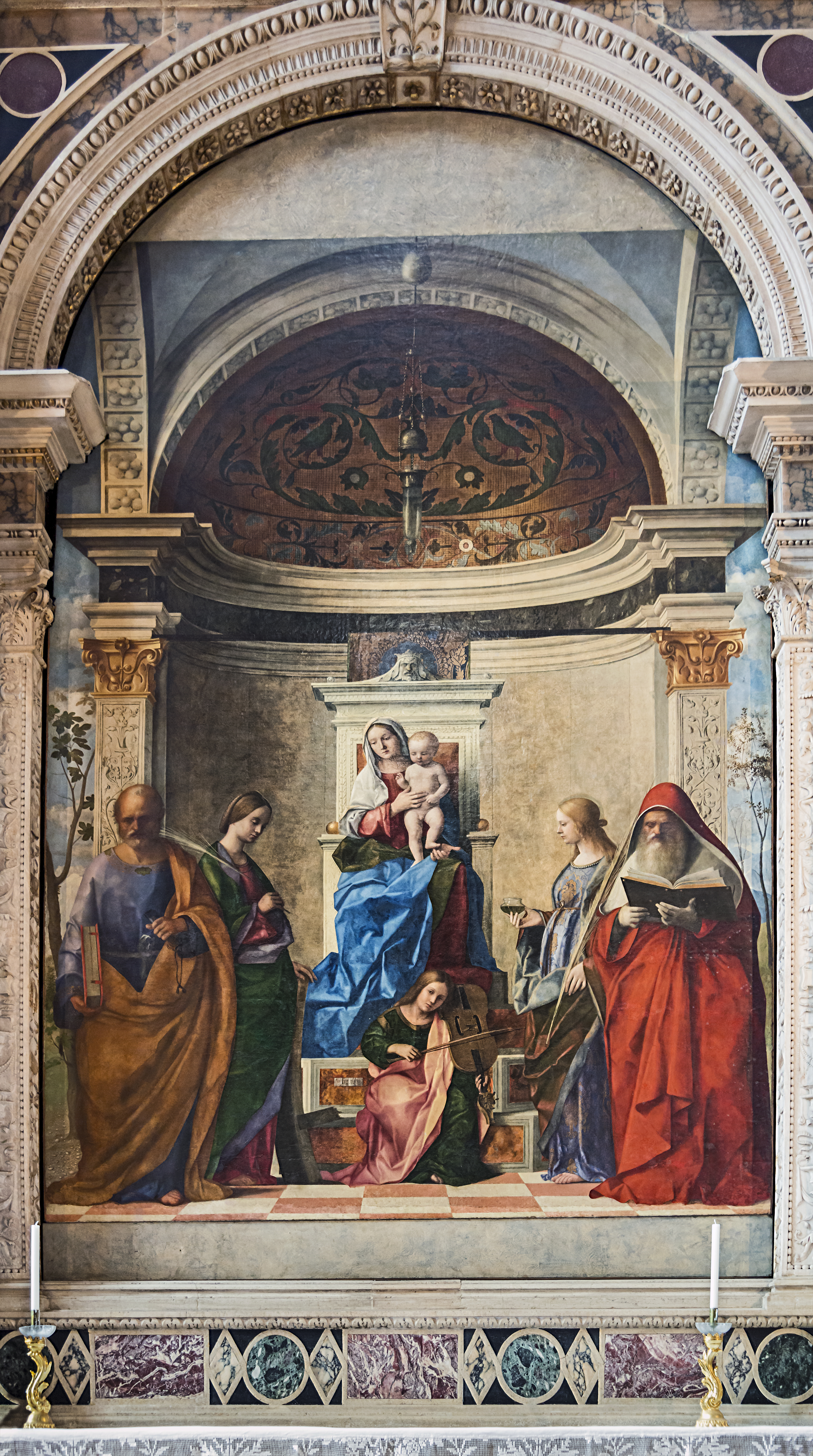
Giovanni Bellini, San Zaccaria Altarpiece, 1505, a late work, San Zaccaria, Venice

The rest of Italy tended to ignore or underestimate Venetian painting; Giorgio Vasari's neglect of the school in the first edition of his Lives of the Most Excellent Painters, Sculptors, and Architects in 1550 was so conspicuous that he realized he needed to visit Venice for extra material in his second edition of 1568. In contrast, foreigners, for whom Venice was often the first major Italian city visited, always had a great appreciation for it and, after Venice itself, the best collections are now in the large European museums rather than other Italian cities. At the top, princely, level, Venetian artists tended to be the most sought after for commissions abroad, from Titian onwards, and in the 18th century most of the best painters spent significant periods abroad, generally with great success.

== Media and techniques ==
Venetian painters were among the first Italians to use oil painting, and also to paint on canvas rather than wooden panels. As a maritime power good quality canvas was always available in Venice, which was also beginning to run rather short of timber. The large size of many Venetian altarpieces (for example Bellini's San Zaccaria Altarpiece of 1505, originally on panel) and other paintings encouraged this, as large panel surfaces were expensive and difficult to construct.

The Venetians did not develop a "native school" of fresco painting, often relying on Padua and Verona, Venetian from 1405, to supply painters (notably Paolo Veronese). They continued to add gold ground mosaics to San Marco long after the rest of Europe had abandoned the medium. Somewhat perversely, they were happy to add frescos to the outside of palazzi, where they deteriorated even faster than elsewhere in Italy, and have only left a few shadowy traces, but apart from the Doge's Palace, used them little in other interior settings. The rapid deterioration of external frescos is often attributed to the seaside Venetian climate, perhaps wrongly. Probably partly for this reason, until the 18th century (with rare exceptions) Venetian churches were never given a coherent scheme of decoration, but feature a "rich profusion of different objects in a picturesque confusion", often with much wall space taken up by grandiose wall-tombs.

Compared with Florentine painting, Venetian painters mostly used and have left fewer drawings. Perhaps for this reason, and despite Venice being Italy's largest centre of printing and publishing throughout the Italian Renaissance and for a considerable time afterwards, the Venetian contribution to printmaking is less than might be expected. Like Raphael, Titian experimented with prints, using specialist collaborators, but to a lesser extent. The engraver Agostino Veneziano moved to Rome in his twenties, and Giulio Campagnola and his adoptive son Domenico Campagnola are the main 16th-century artists who concentrated on printmaking and remained in the Republic of Venice, apparently mostly in Padua. The situation was different in the 18th century, when both Canaletto and the two Tiepolos were significant etchers, and Giovanni Battista Piranesi, though famous for his views of Rome, continued to describe himself as a Venetian for decades after moving to Rome.

== Early development, to 1500 ==
=== 14th century ===
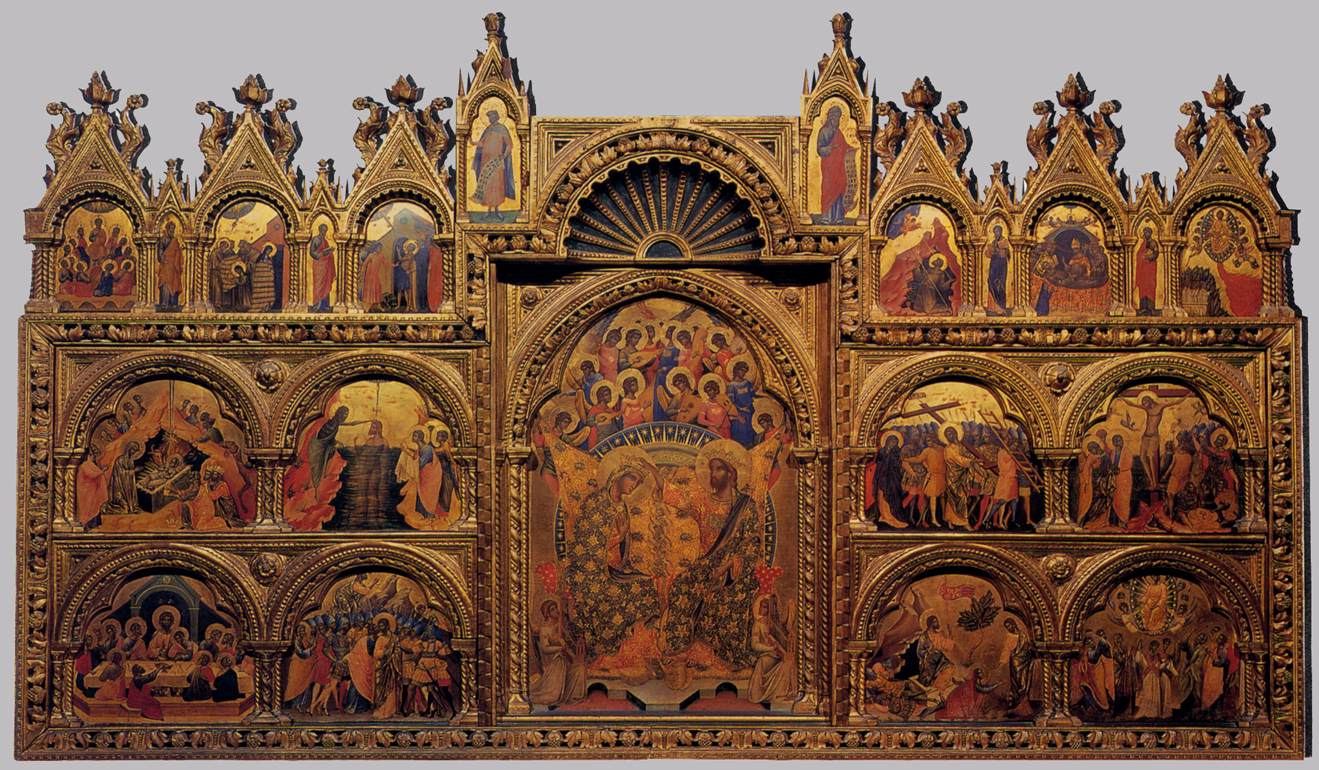
Paolo Veneziano, polyptych altarpiece with Coronation of the Virgin, c. 1350

Paolo Veneziano, probably active between about 1320 and 1360, is the first major figure we can name, and "the founder of the Venetian school". He seems to have introduced the "composite altarpiece" of many small scenes within an elaborate gilded wooden frame, which remained dominant in churches for two centuries. These transferred to painting the form of the huge, jewel-encrusted and very famous Pala d'Oro behind the main altar in San Marco, the enamel panels for which had been made in, and later looted from, Constantinople for successive doges. In fact, one of Veneziano's commissions was to paint "weekday" panels to fit over the Pala, which was only revealed for feast-days. His style shows no influence from Giotto, active a generation earlier.

The earliest form of Italian Renaissance painting was first seen in Venice when Guariento di Arpo from Padua was commissioned to paint frescos in the Doge's Palace in 1365.

=== 15th century ===
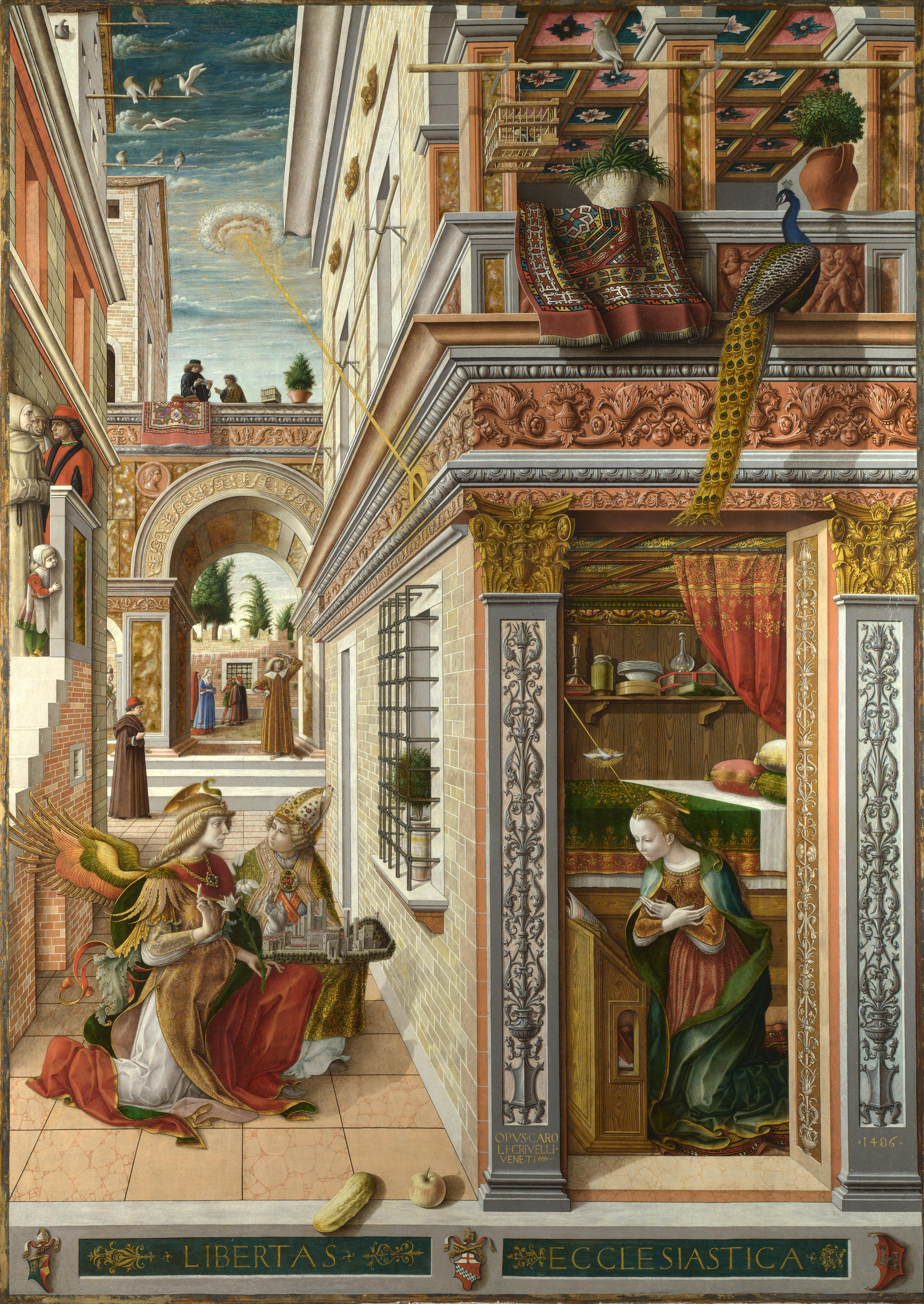
Carlo Crivelli, The Annunciation, with St. Emidius, 1486

The traditional Italo-Byzantine style persisted until around 1400 when the dominant style began to shift towards International Gothic, with Jacobello del Fiore a transitional figure and the trend, which continued in the rather charming work of Michele Giambono (c. 1400 – c. 1462), who also designed mosaics for San Marco. Gentile da Fabriano and Pisanello were both in Venice during much of the years 1405–1409, painting frescos (now lost) in the Doge's Palace and elsewhere.

By the mid-century, when the Florentine quattrocento was fully mature, Venice still lagged well behind. Perhaps the most visible work in Venice in the Tuscan style was a mosaic Death of the Virgin, in the Capella Mascoli in San Marco, next to a design by Gambono, though other works in the city included frescos by Andrea Castagno. The Vivarini and Bellini families were the two major dynasties of 15th-century painters in the city, and the Vivarini, though in the end more conservative, were initially the first to embrace styles from the south.

Carlo Crivelli (c. 1430–1495) was born in the city, but spent his mature career outside the Republic's territories. His style – highly individual, rather linear, and somewhat neurotic – had no influence on later Venetian painting.

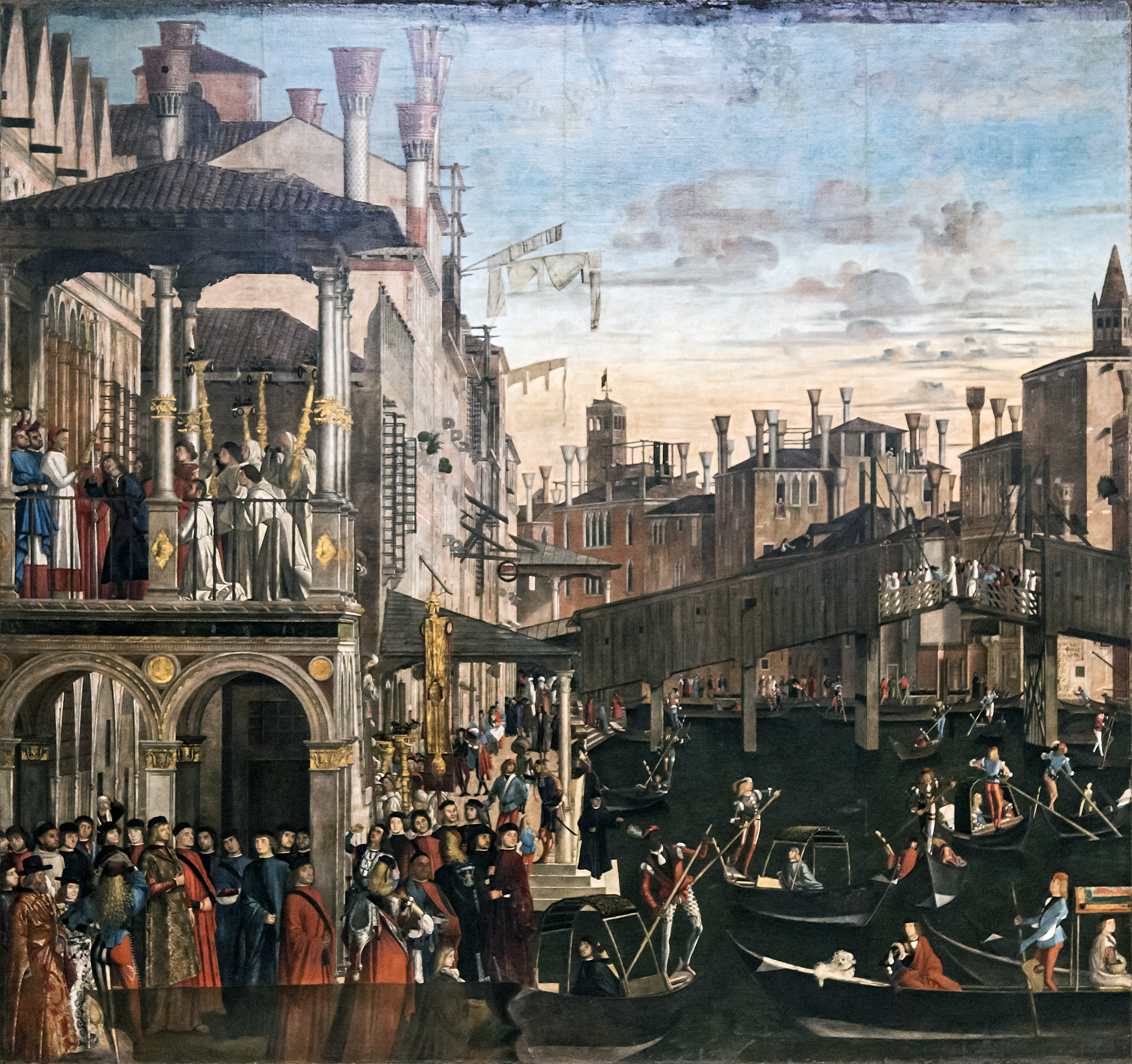
Vittore Carpaccio, Miracle of the Relic of the Cross at the Ponte di Rialto, c. 1496

From the late-15th century, Venetian painting developed through links with Andrea Mantegna (1431–1506) (from nearby Padua) and of a visit by Antonello da Messina (c. 1430–1479), who introduced the oil painting technique of Early Netherlandish painting, probably acquired through his training in Naples. Another external factor was the visit by Leonardo da Vinci, who was particularly influential on Giorgione.

During his long career, Giovanni Bellini has been credited with creating the Venetian style. After earlier works, such as his Madonna of the Small Trees (c. 1487), which largely reflect the linear approach of Mantegna, he later developed a softer style, where glowing colours are used to represent form and suggest an atmospheric haze. Applying this approach in his San Zaccaria Altarpiece (1505), the high viewpoint, the uncluttered and interconnected figures arranged in space, and the subtle gestures all combine to form a tranquil yet majestic image. With such works he has been described as reaching the High Renaissance ideals, and certainly expresses the key distinctive factors of the Venetian school.

Vittore Carpaccio (c. 1465–1525/1526) was a pupil of Bellini, with a distinct style. He was rather conservative, and ignored the High Renaissance style developing in the later part of his career, indeed retaining a Late Gothic poetry in many works. With Gentile Bellini, many of Carpaccio's large works give us famous scenes of contemporary life in the city; at this period such views were unusual. He was one of the first painters to mostly use canvas rather than panels. There were a number of other painters who continued essentially quattrocento styles in the two decades after 1500; Cima da Conegliano (c. 1459 – c. 1517) is the most significant.

== 16th century ==
=== Giorgione and Titian ===
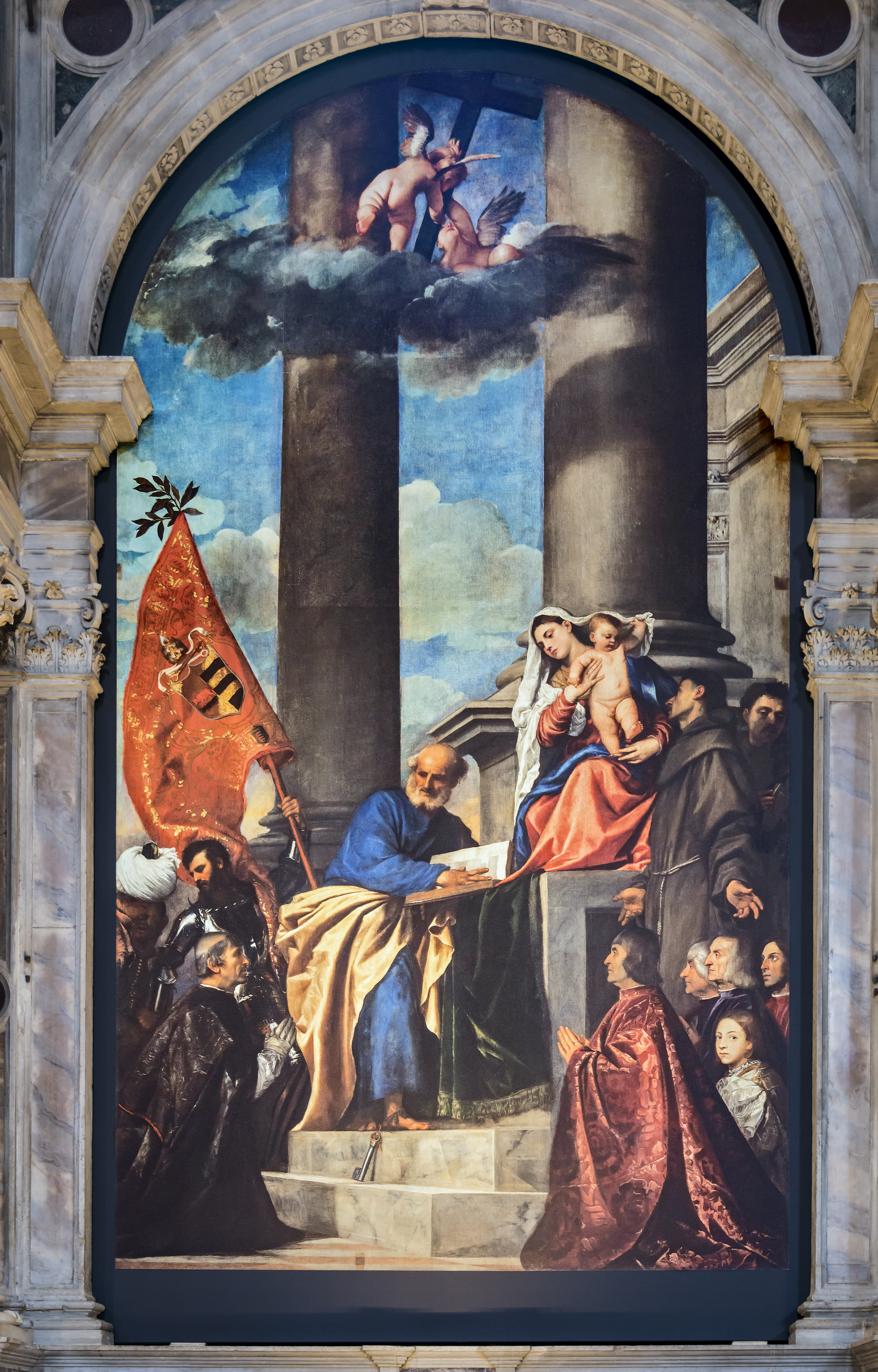
Titian's early and dramatically composed Pesaro Madonna (1526), with rich Venetian colouring

Giorgione and Titian were both apprentices at Bellini's workshop. A speciality of Giorgione's were idyllic Arcadian scenes, with an example being his Three Philosophers, and this element was adopted by his master Bellini, who increased the landscape in his many Madonnas, and by Titian in work like Pastoral Concert (1508) and Sacred and Profane Love (1515). This emphasis on nature as a setting was a major contribution of the Venetian School.

Titian, through his long and productive life, with a wide variety of themes and subjects was the most influential and greatest of all the Venetian painters. His early Pesaro Madonna (1519–1528) shows a bold new composition for such a traditional religious subject, putting the focal point of the Madonna off from the centre and on a steep diagonal. Colours are used to enliven the painting, but also to unify the composition, such as by the large red flag on the left counterbalancing the red in the Madonna and such skilful and sumptuous use of colour became a hallmark of the Venetian style.

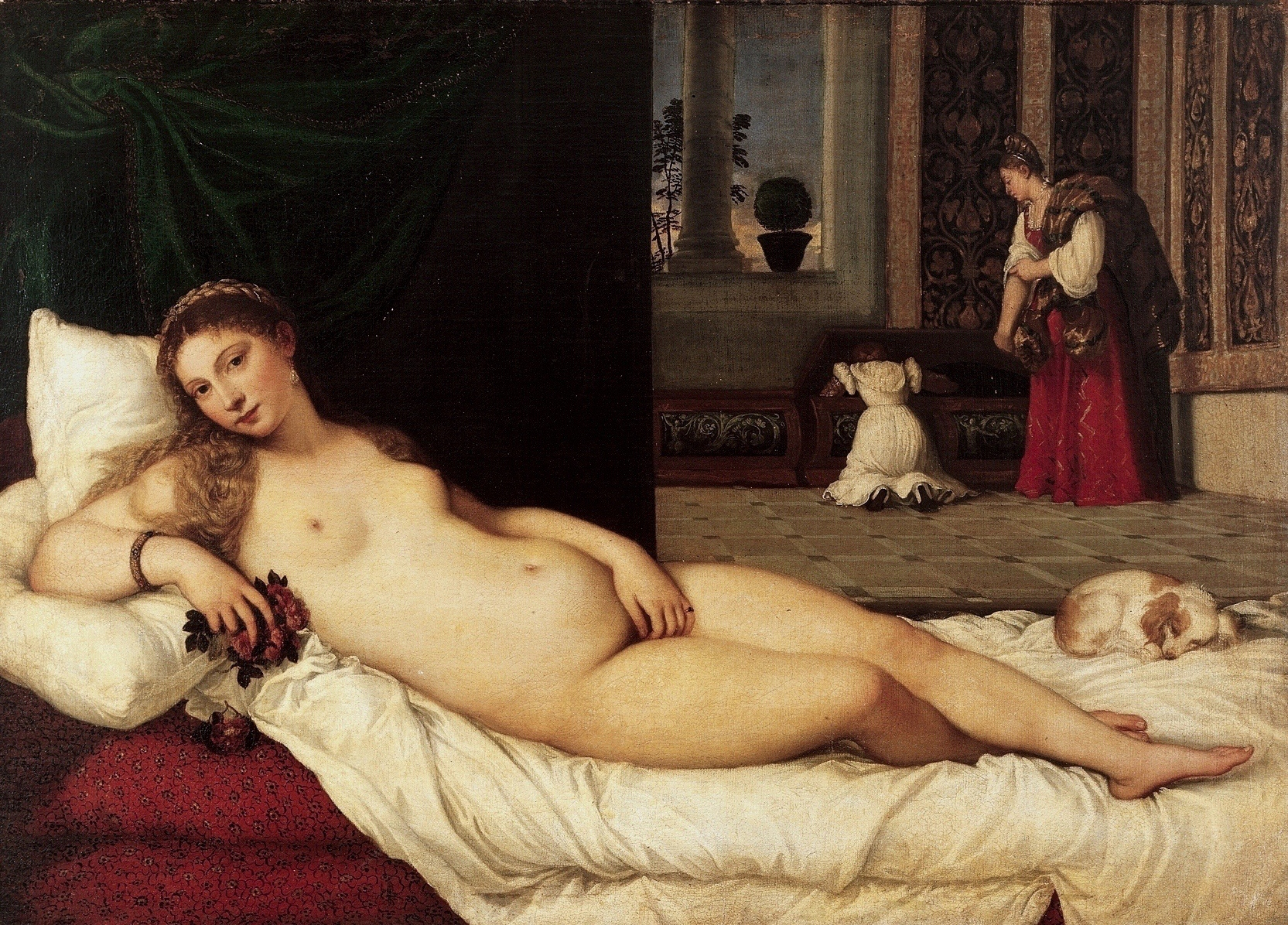
Titian's reclining Venus of Urbino (1538), with a lapdog on the right, balancing the face on the left, is an erotic work.

Although pre-figured by the Sleeping Venus (completed by Titian after Giorgione's death in 1510) Titian is credited with establishing the reclining female nude as an important subgenre in art. Using mythological subjects, works such as the Venus of Urbino (1538) richly depict the fabrics and other textures, and use a composition that is carefully controlled by organising colours. As an example, in this painting the diagonal of the nude is matched by the opposite diagonal between the red of the cushions in the front with the red skirts of the woman in the background.

With other Venetian painters such as Palma Vecchio, Titian established the genre of half-length portraits of imaginary beautiful women, often given rather vague mythological or allegorical titles, with attributes to match. The artists apparently did nothing to discourage the belief that these were modelled for by the most celebrated of Venice's famous courtesans, and sometimes this may have been the case.

Titian continued to paint religious subjects with growing intensity, and mythological subjects, which produced many of his most famous later works, above all the poesie series for Philip II of Spain.

With such paintings, readily transported by virtue of being oils on canvas, Titian became famous, and helped establish a reputation for Venetian art. Possession of such paintings symbolised luxurious wealth, and for his skills in portraiture he was sought by powerful, rich individuals, such as in his long relationship working for Emperor Charles V and Philip II of Spain.

=== After Giorgione ===
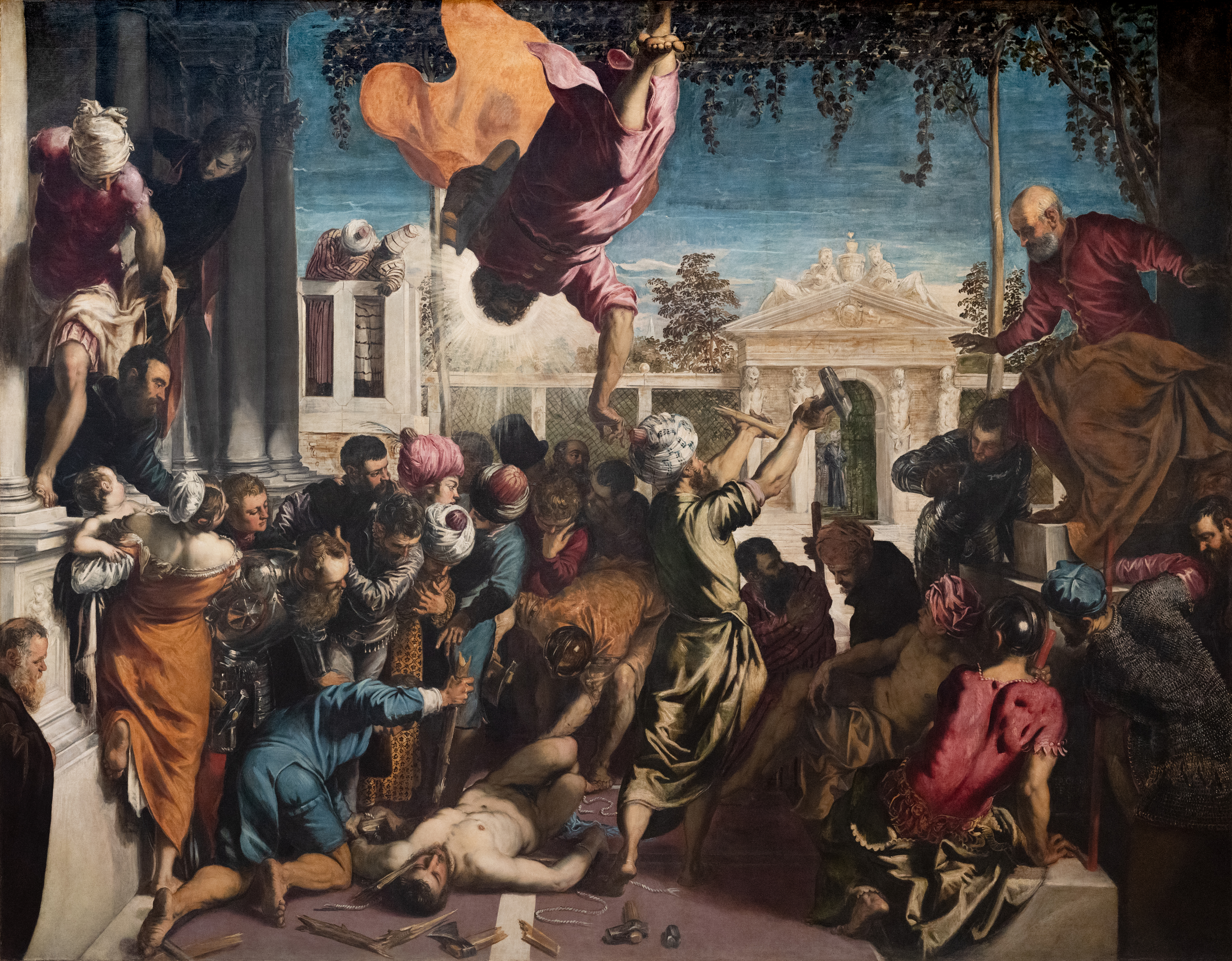
Miracle of the Slave (1548), one of a trio of Tintoretto works on St Mark, the patron saint of Venice

The long dominance of Titian in the Venetian painting scene could be a problem for other ambitious Venetian painters. Palma Vecchio (c. 1480–1528) was slightly older than Titian, and apparently content to follow in the wake of the two great innovators; many easel paintings long attributed to Titian may actually be by him. His great-nephew, Palma il Giovane (1548/50–1628), Titian's pupil, much later played a similar role, using the styles of Tintoretto and Veronese.

Lorenzo Lotto (c. 1480–1556/57) was born in the city, but spent most of his mature career in the terraferma, especially Bergamo. He painted religious subjects and portraits in a highly individual and sometimes eccentric style, which despite their rich colouring have a restlessness that is at odds with the Venetian mainstream.

Sebastiano del Piombo (c. 1485–1547) accepted a good commission in Rome in 1511, and never worked in Venice again. But in Rome he soon found that Michelangelo was equally dominant, and began a long and complicated relationship with him; eventually they fell out. His style combined Venetian colour and Roman classical grandeur, and did something to spread Venetian style to the new centre of Italian painting.

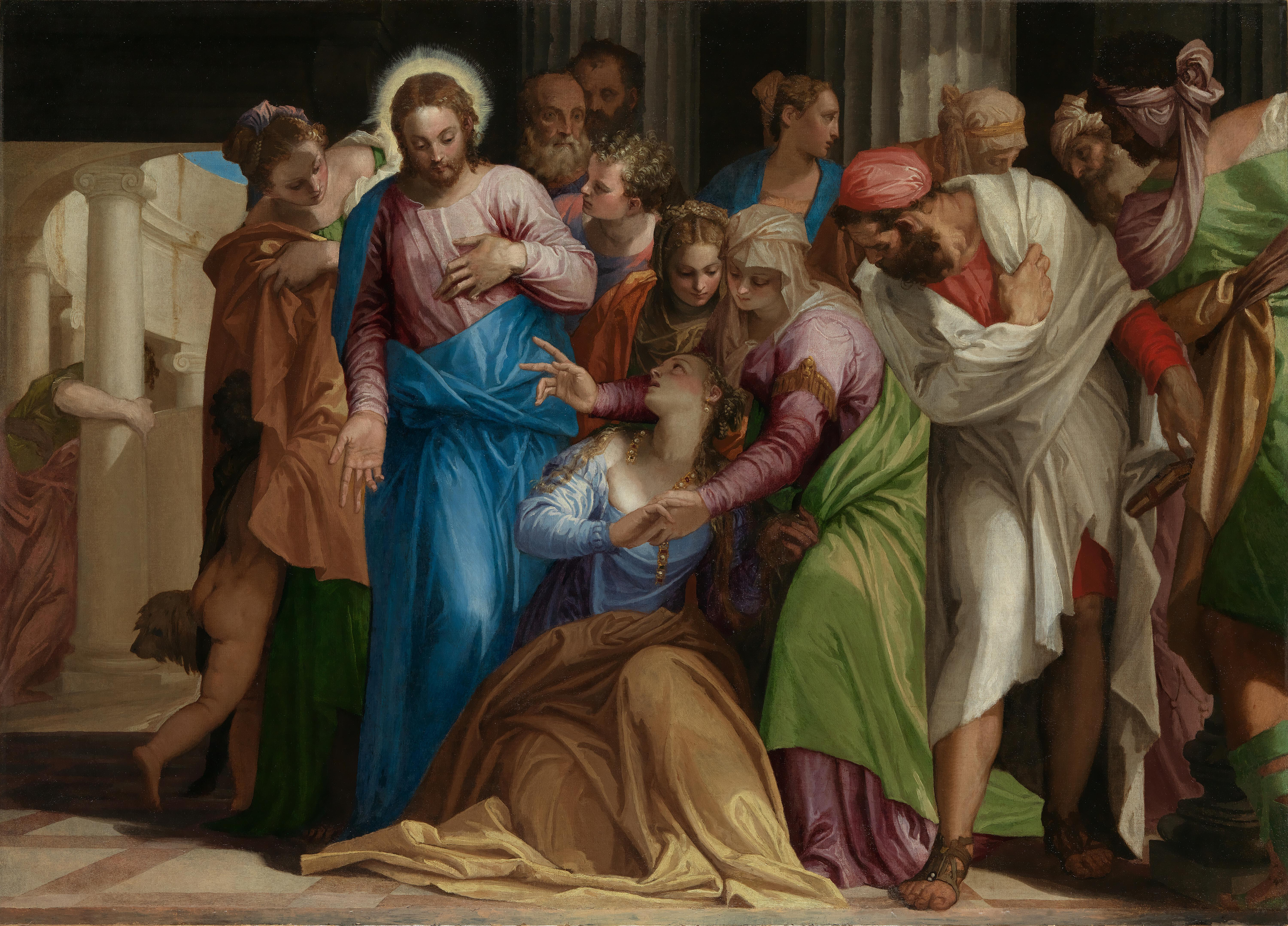
An early Paolo Veronese, The Conversion of Mary Magdalene, c. 1548

Paolo Veronese (1528–1588), from Verona in the Venetian terraferma, came to Venice in 1553, once he was established, commissioned to paint huge fresco schemes for the Doge's Palace, and stayed for the rest of his career.

Although Tintoretto is sometimes classified as a Mannerist artist, he also incorporates Venetian and individualistic aspects. In his Miracle of the Slave (1548), the Mannerist features include the crowded scene, the twisting linking of figures (as in the central figures, from the foreshortened slave on the ground to the miraculous figure of St. Mark in the sky, through the turbaned, grey-robed figure), and the drama in the gestures and poses. But the colouring maintains the warm reds, golds and greens of the Venetian school, and the figures are arranged in real three-dimensional space, in contrast to the more compressed compositions of many Mannerist works, and with its intensely theatrical, stage-like display his painting is a forerunner of the Baroque.

Jacopo Bassano (c. 1510–1592), followed by the four sons in his workshop, developed a rustic style which he practiced for decades from his small hometown of Bassano del Grappa, some 65 km from Venice. His sons continued to work in it long after his death; Baroque painting was very slow to appeal to the Venetian market.

These are a few of the most outstanding in the great number of artists in the Venetian tradition, many originally from outside the Republic's territory.

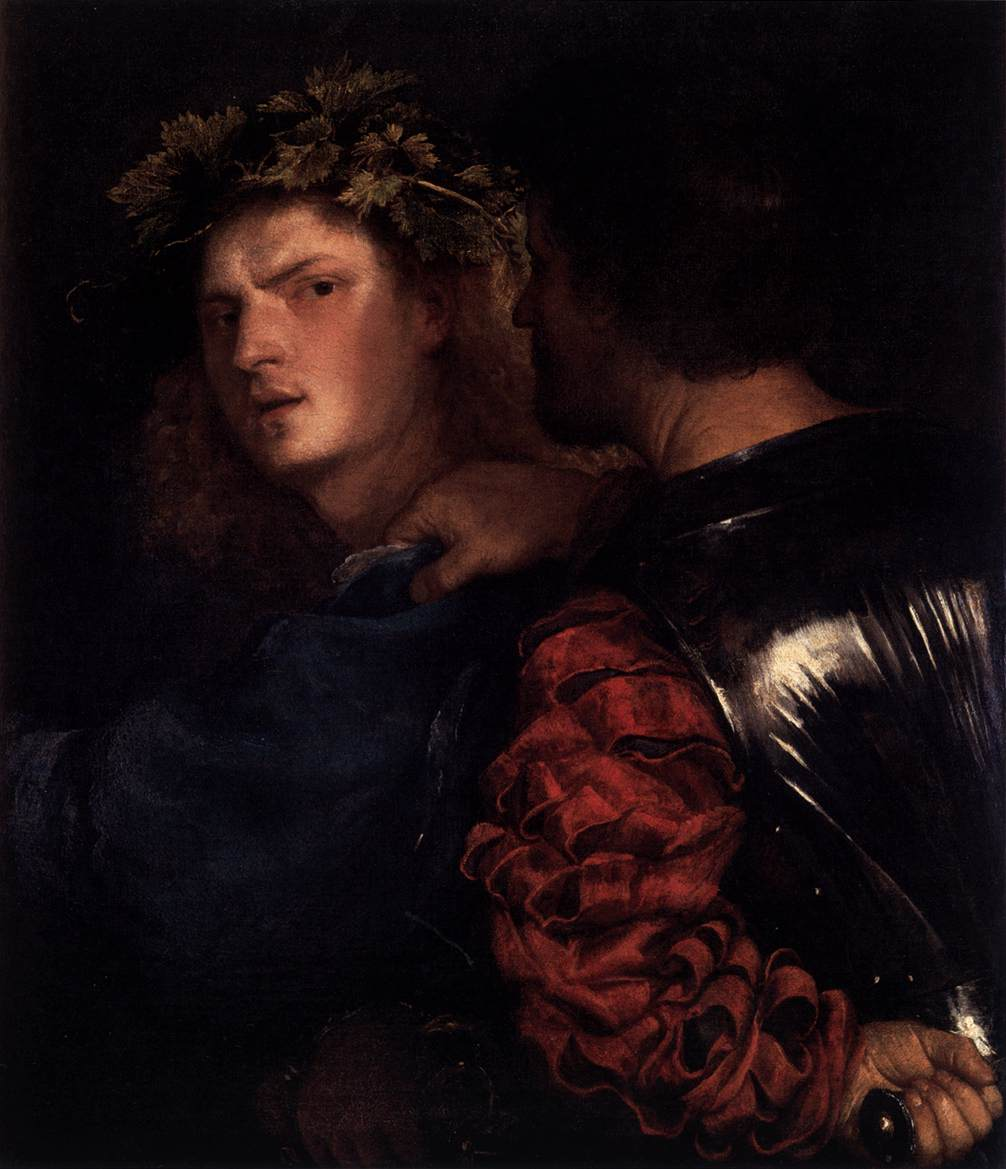
The Bravo, an example of a painting often attributed to Titian or Giorgione, but also to Palma Vecchio

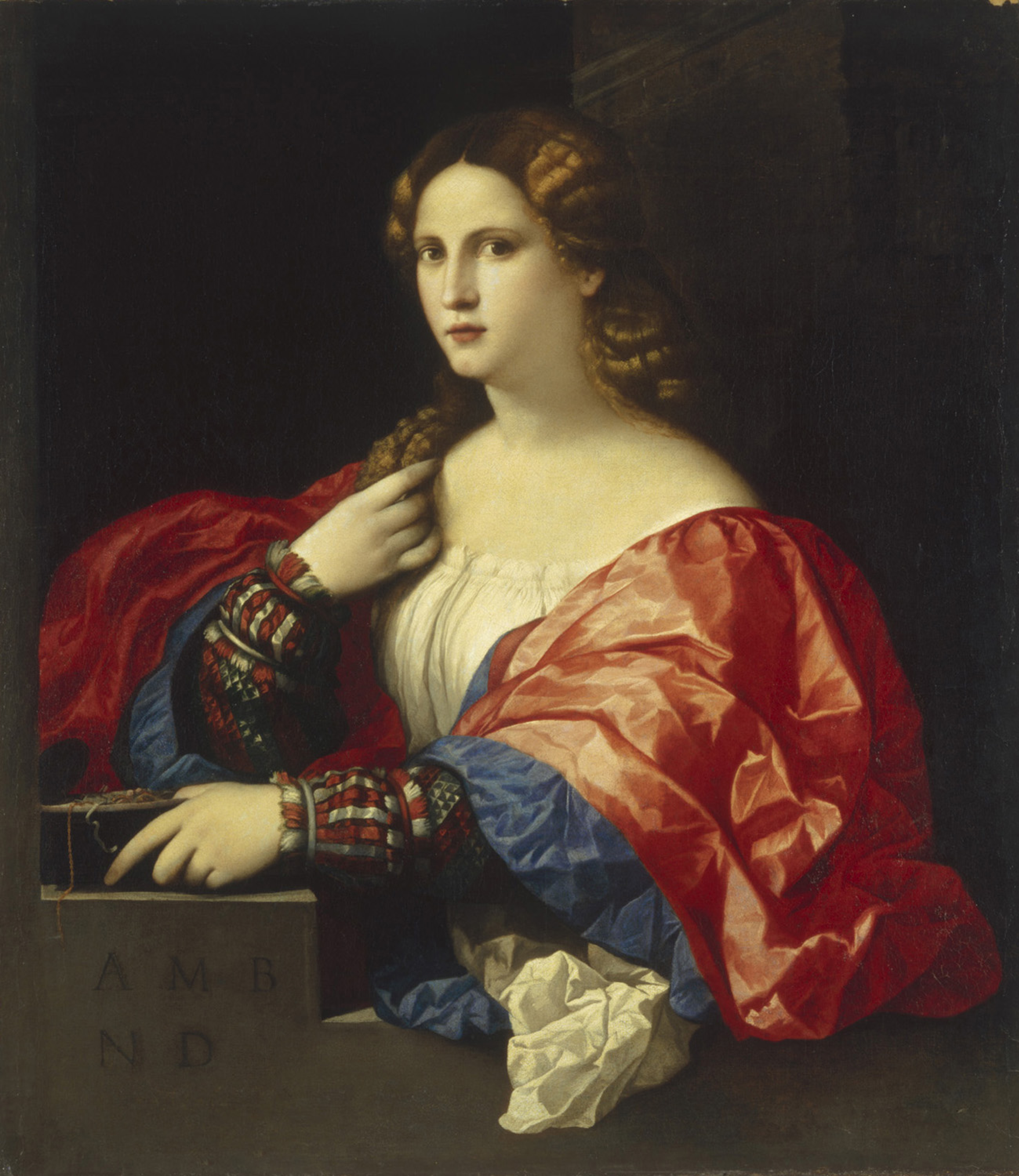
La Bella, Palma Vecchio, 1518–20

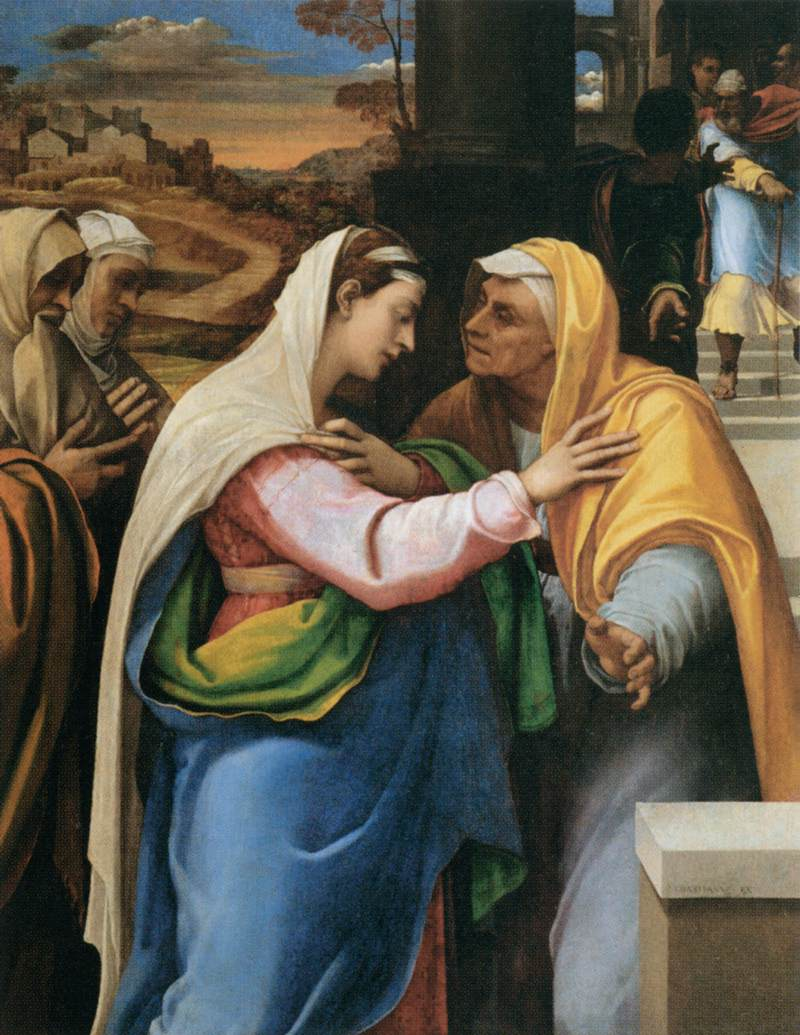
Sebastiano del Piombo, Visitation, 1518–19

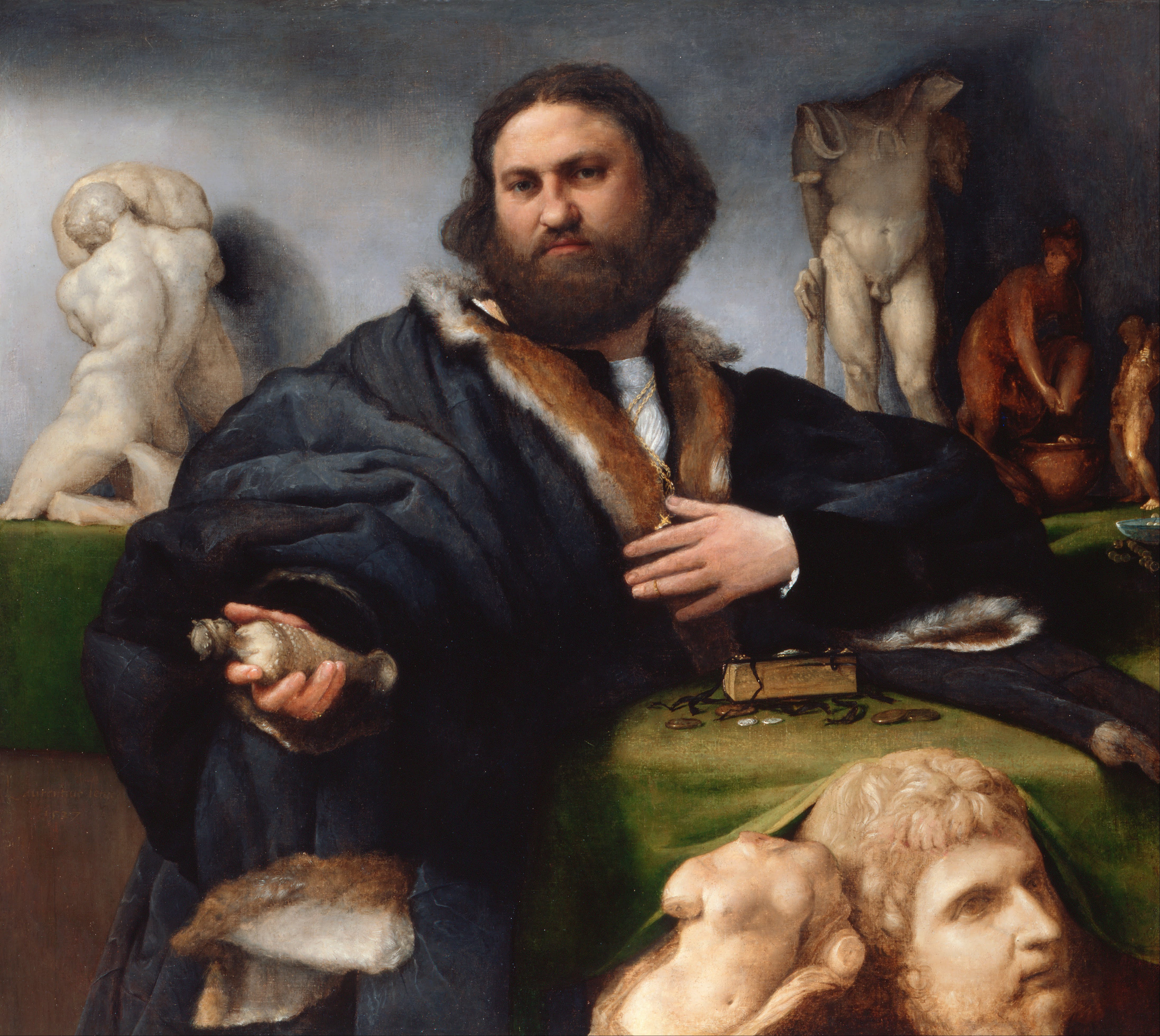
Lorenzo Lotto, Portrait of Andrea Odoni, 1527

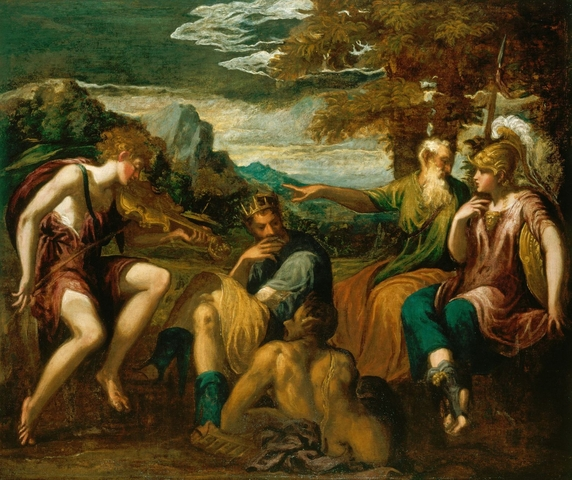
Andrea Schiavone, Judgement of Midas, c. 1548–50

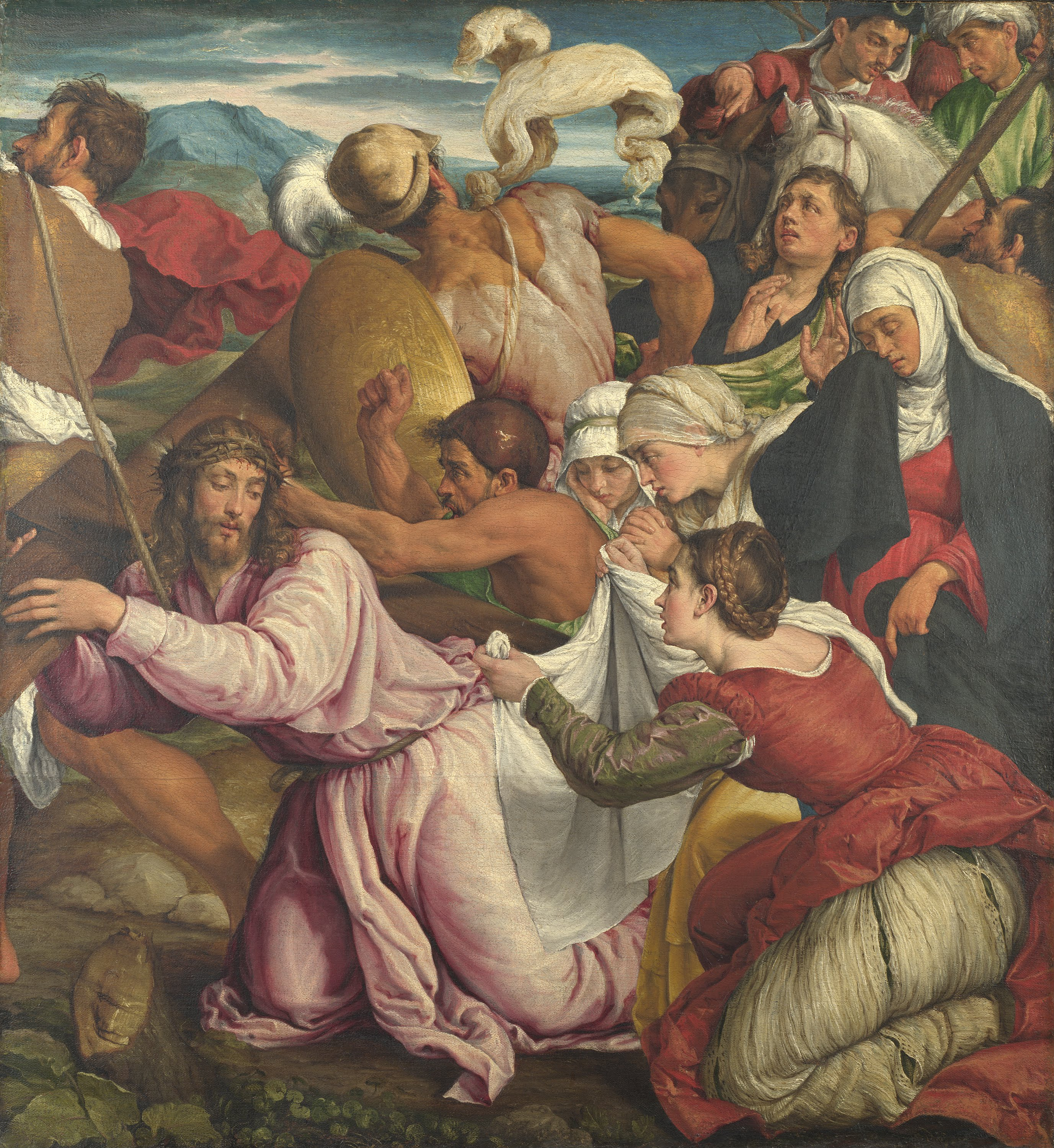
Jacopo Bassano, The Way to Calvary, c. 1540

== 17th century ==
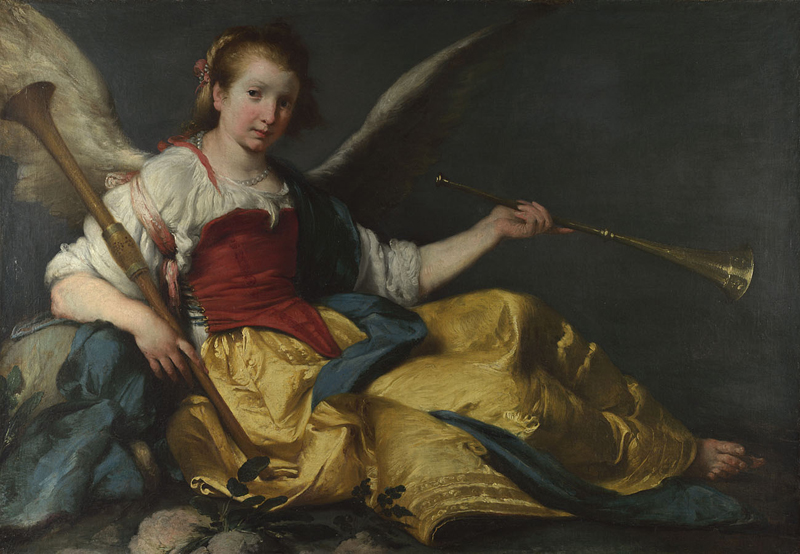
Bernardo Strozzi, Personification of Fame, probably 1635–36

The 17th century was a low point in Venetian painting, especially in the first decades when Palma Giovane, Domenico Tintoretto (the son), the Bassani sons, Padovanino and others continued to turn out works essentially in the styles of the previous century. The most significant artists working in the city were all immigrants: Domenico Fetti (c. 1589–1623) from Rome, Bernardo Strozzi (c. 1581–1644) from Genoa, and the north German Johann Liss (c. 1590? – c. 1630). All were aware of the Baroque painting of Rome or Genoa, and in different ways developed styles reflecting and uniting these and traditional Venetian handling of paint and colour.

New directions were taken by two individual painters, Francesco Maffei from Vicenza (c. 1600–1660) and Sebastiano Mazzoni from Florence (1611–1678), who both worked mainly in Venice or the terraferma in unorthodox and free Baroque styles, both marked by the Venetian trait of bravura brushwork.

Visits to Venice by the leading Neapolitan painter Luca Giordano in 1653 and 1685 left a body of work in the latest Baroque style, and had an energising effect on younger artists such as Giovan Battista Langetti, Pietro Liberi, Antonio Molinari, and the German Johann Carl Loth.

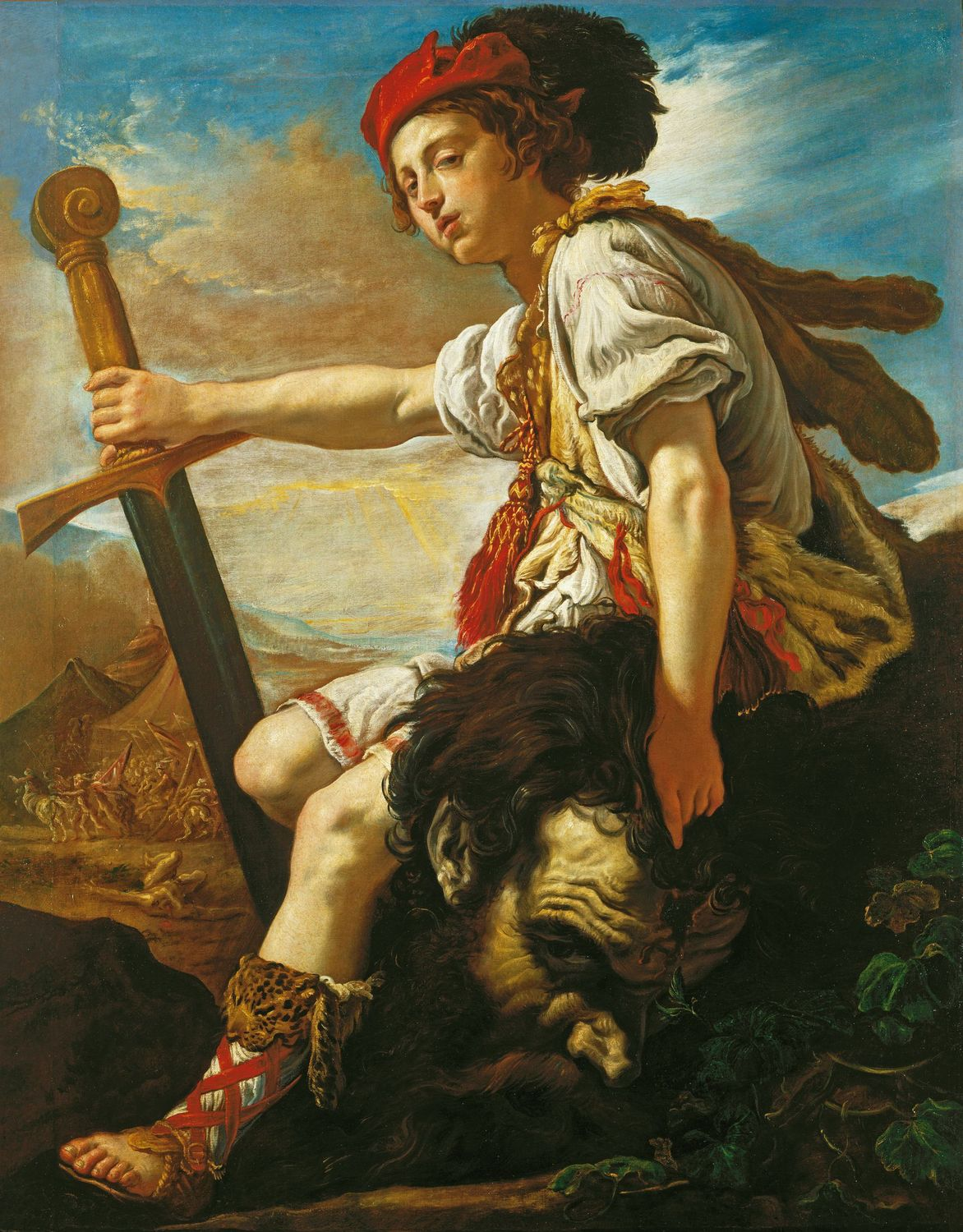
Domenico Fetti, David with the Head of Goliath, c. 1620 (Royal Collection version)

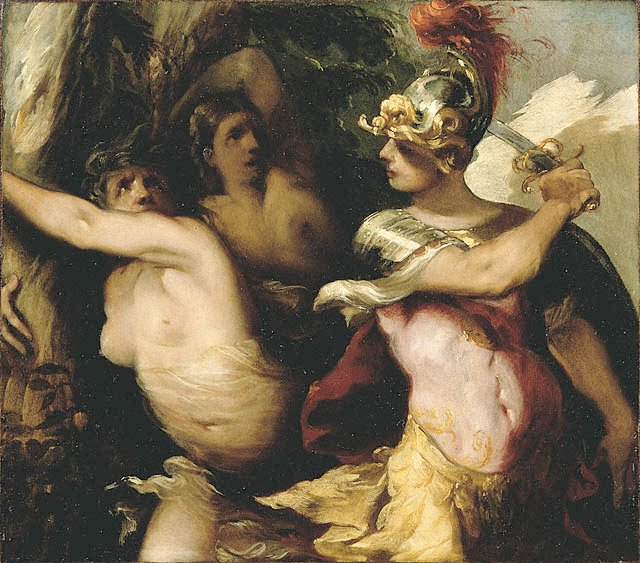
Francesco Maffei, Rinaldo's Conquest of the Enchanted Forest, 1650–1655

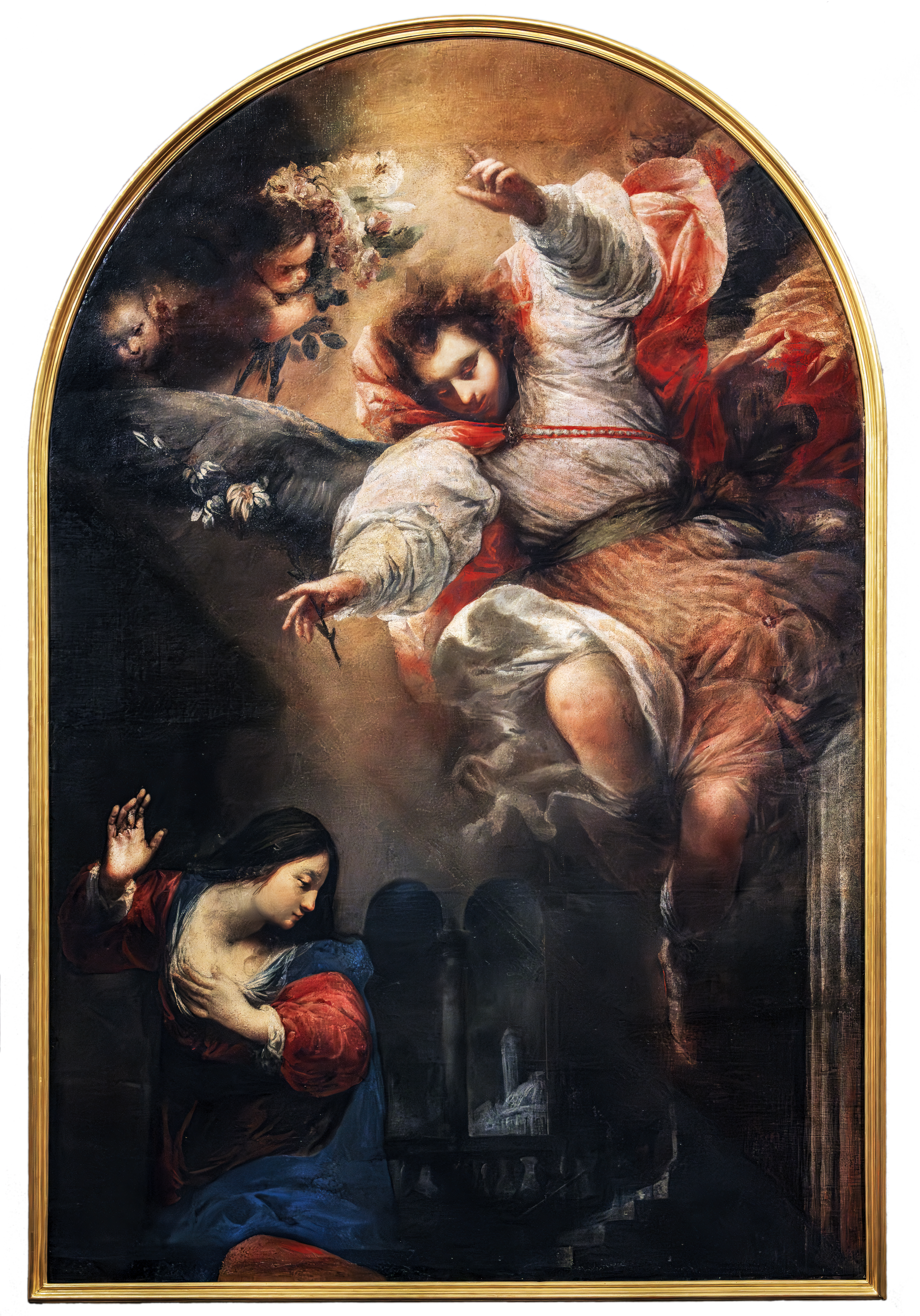
Sebastiano Mazzoni, Annunciation, c. 1650

== 18th century ==
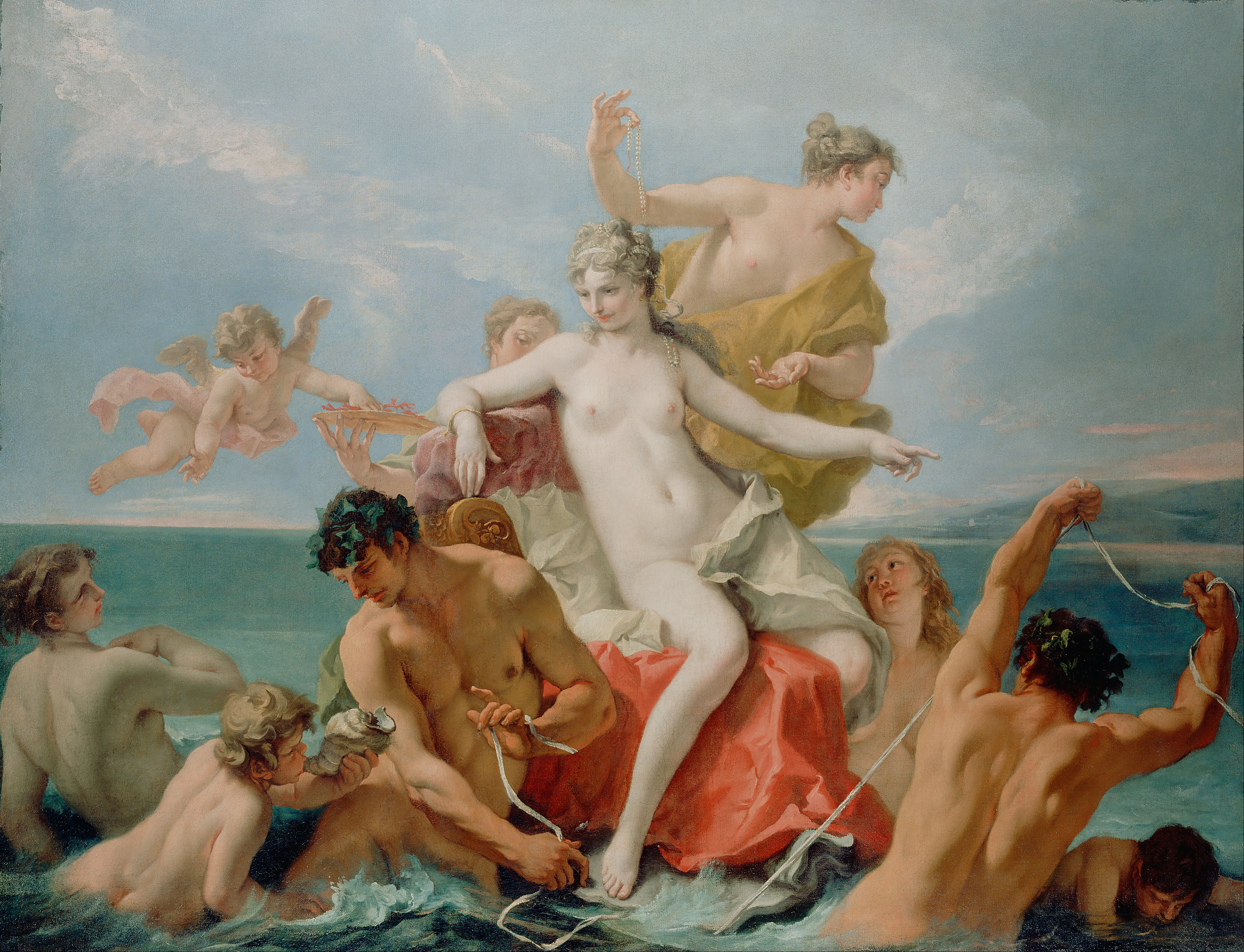
Sebastiano Ricci, Triumph of the Marine Venus, c. 1713

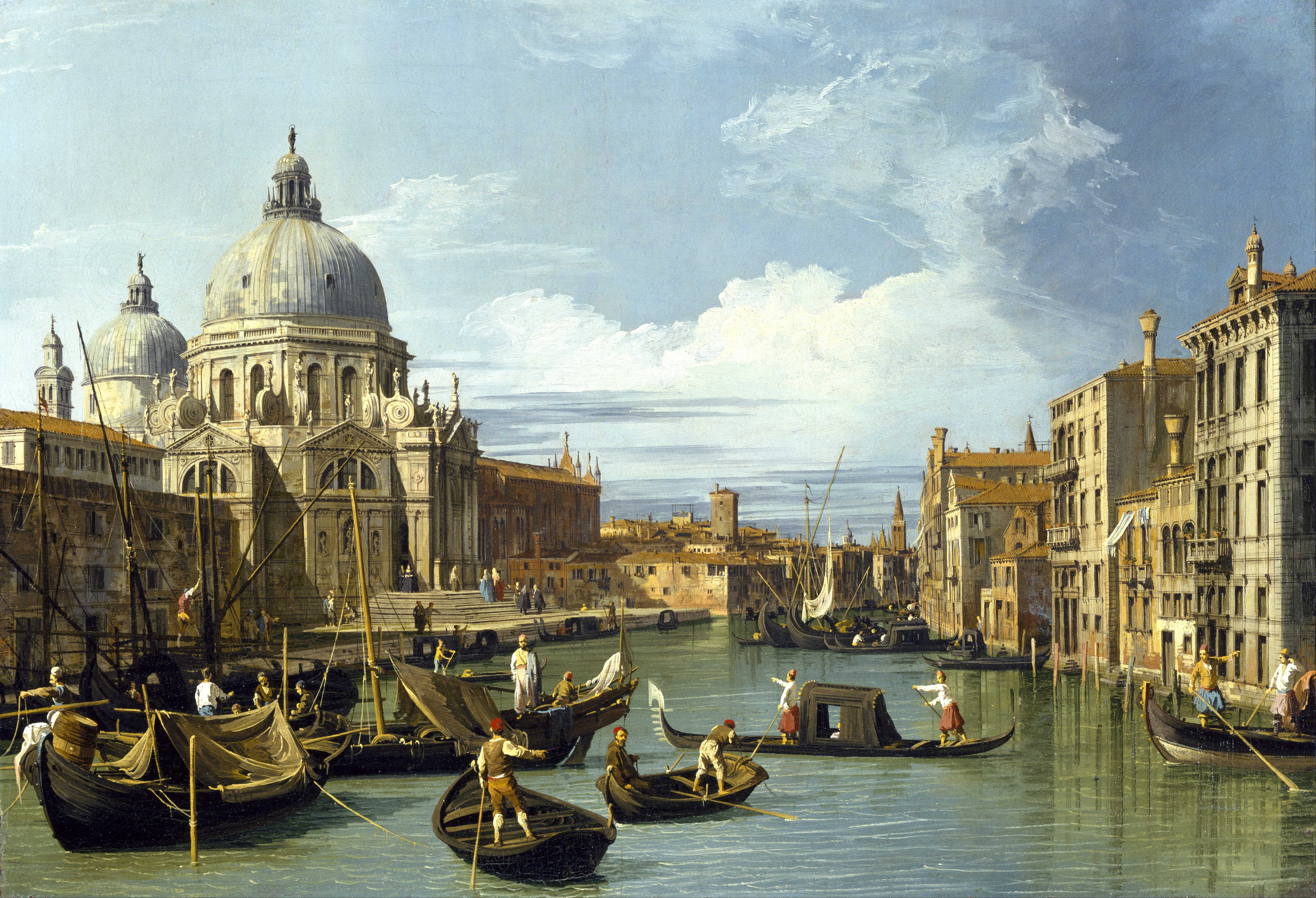
Canaletto, The Entrance to the Grand Canal, c. 1730, a typical veduta

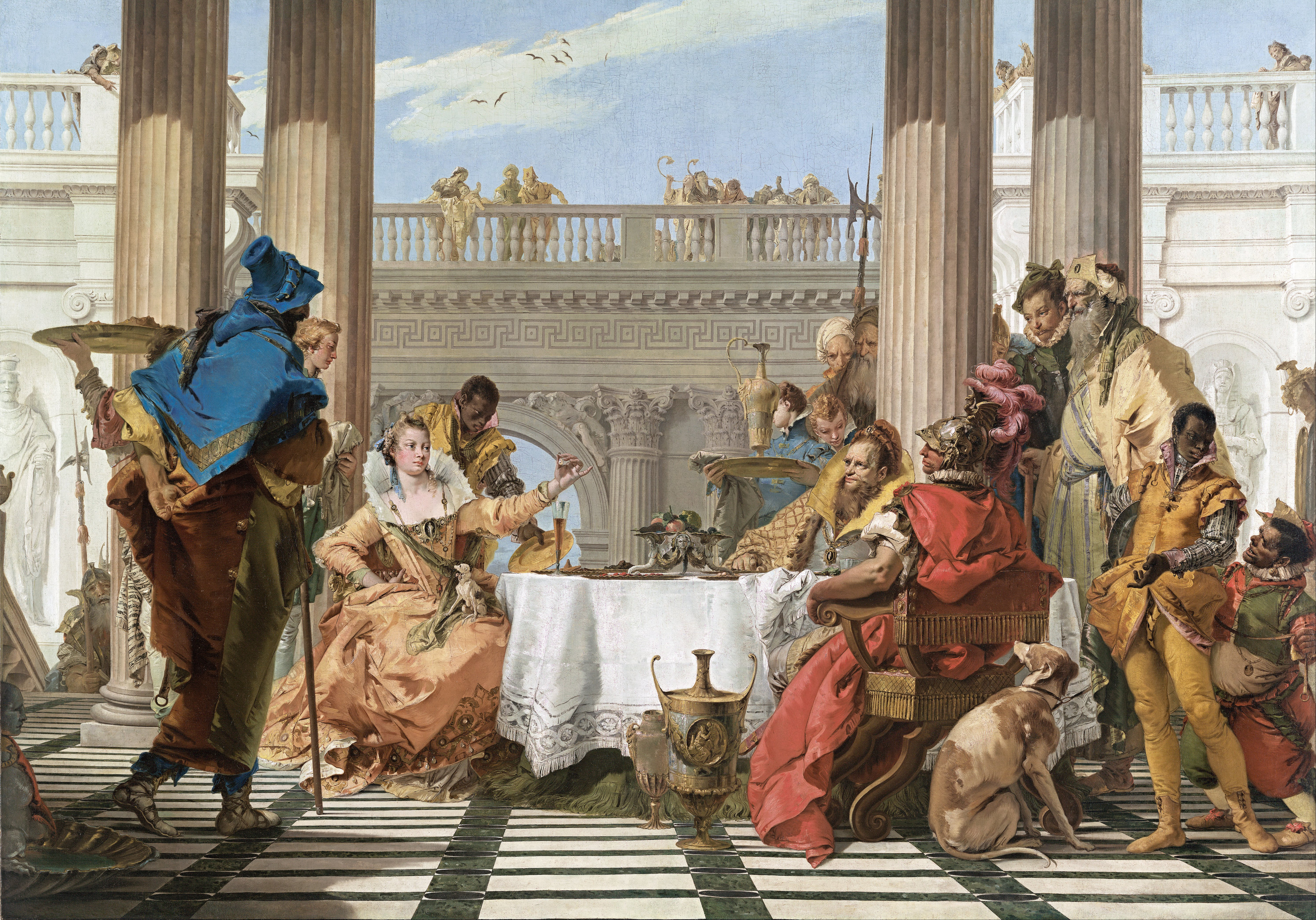
Giovanni Battista Tiepolo, The Banquet of Cleopatra, 1743–44

At the end of the 17th century things began to change dramatically, and for much of the 18th century Venetian painters were in remarkable demand all over Europe, even as the city itself declined and was a much reduced market, in particular for large works; "Venetian art had become, by the mid-eighteenth century, a commodity primarily for export." The first significant artist in the new style was Sebastiano Ricci (1659–1734), from Belluno in the terraferma, who trained in Venice before leaving under a cloud. He returned for a decade in 1698, and then again at the end of his life, after time in England, France and elsewhere. Drawing especially on Veronese, he developed a light, airy, Baroque style that foreshadowed the painting of most of the rest of the century, and was a great influence on young Venetian painters.

Giovanni Antonio Pellegrini was influenced by Ricci, and worked with his nephew Marco Ricci, but also by the later Roman Baroque. His career was mostly spent away from the city, working in several countries north of the Alps, where the new Venetian style was greatly in demand for decorating houses. It was actually slower to be accepted in Venice itself. Jacopo Amigoni (a. 1685–1752) was another travelling Venetian decorator of palaces, who was also popular for proto-Rococo portraits. He ended as a court painter in Madrid. Rosalba Carriera (1673–1757), the most significant Venetian woman artist, was purely a portraitist, mostly in pastel, where she was an important technical innovator, preparing the way for this important 18th-century form. She achieved great international success, in particular in London, Paris and Vienna.

Giovanni Battista Tiepolo (1696–1770) is the last great Venetian painter, who was also in demand all over Europe, and painted two of his largest fresco schemes in the Würzburg Residence in northern Bavaria (1750–1753) and the Royal Palace of Madrid, where he died in 1770.

The final flowering also included the varied talents of Giambattista Pittoni, Canaletto, Giovan Battista Piazzetta, and Francesco Guardi, as well as Giovanni Domenico Tiepolo, the most distinguished of several of the family to train with and assist Giovanni Battista Tiepolo.

Canaletto, his pupil and nephew Bernardo Bellotto, Michele Marieschi, and Guardi specialized in landscape painting, painting two distinct types: firstly vedute or detailed and mostly accurate panoramic views, usually of the city itself, many bought by wealthy northerners making the Grand Tour. Few Canalettos remain in Venice. The other type was the capriccio, a fanciful imaginary scene, often of classical ruins, with staffage figures. Marco Ricci was the first Venetian painter of capricci, and the form received a final development by Guardi, who produced many freely painted scenes set in the lagoon, with water, boats and land in "paintings of great tonal delicacy, whose poetic mood is tinged with nostalgia".

Pietro Longhi (c. 1702–1785) was Venetian painting's most significant genre painter, turning early in his career to specialize in small scenes of contemporary Venetian life, mostly with an element of gentle satire. He was one of the first Italian painters to mine this vein, and was also an early painter of conversation piece portraits. Unlike most Venetian artists, large numbers of lively sketches by him survive.

The death of Guardi in 1793, soon followed by the extinction of the Republic by French Revolutionary armies in 1797, effectively brought the distinctive Venetian style to an end; it had at least outlasted its rival Florence in that respect. In fact, Francesco Hayez (1791–1882), probably the major Italian 19th-century painter, was born and trained in Venice, but mostly pursued his career in Milan and other cities.

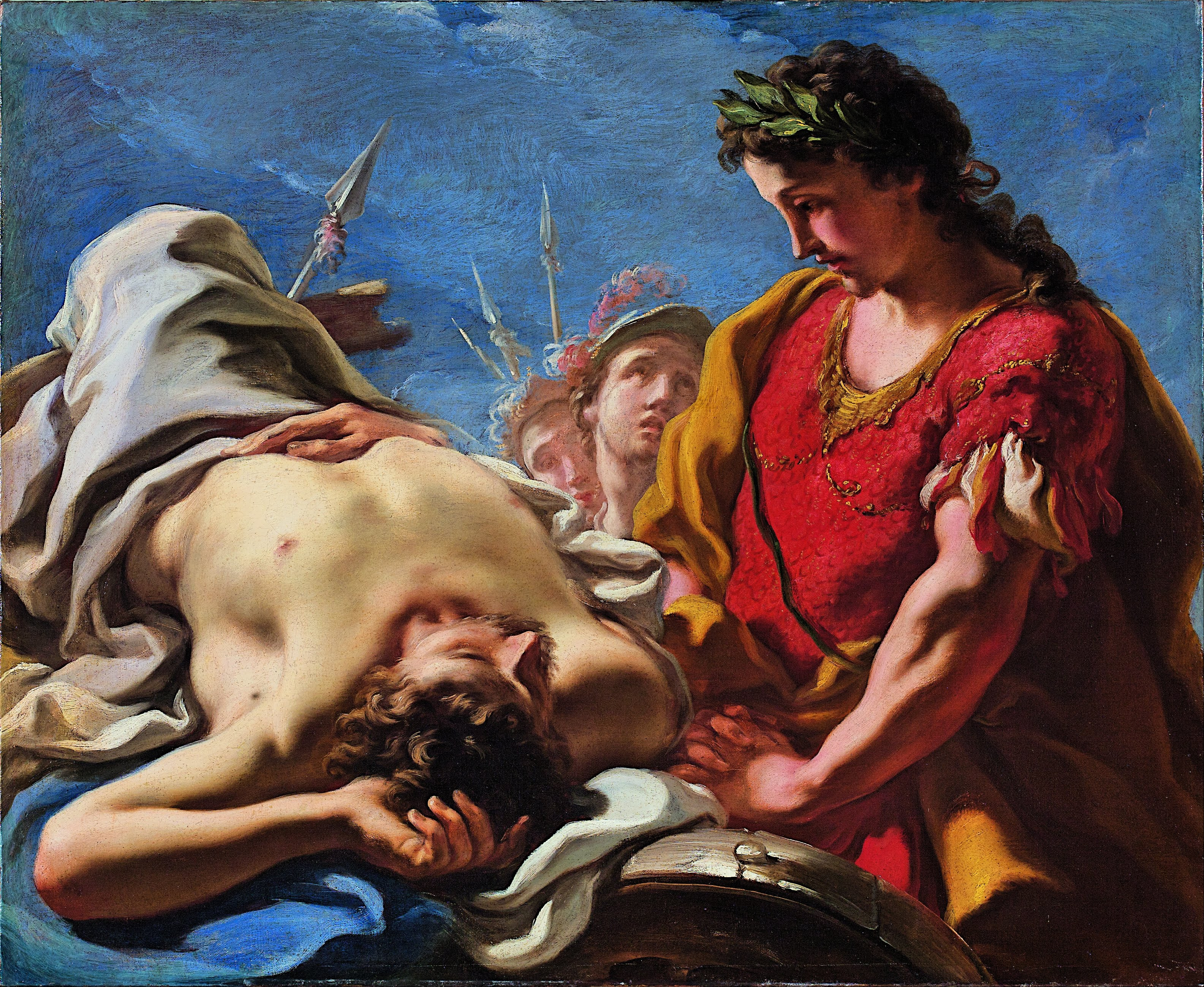
Giovanni Antonio Pellegrini, Alexander with the Corpse of Darius, 1708

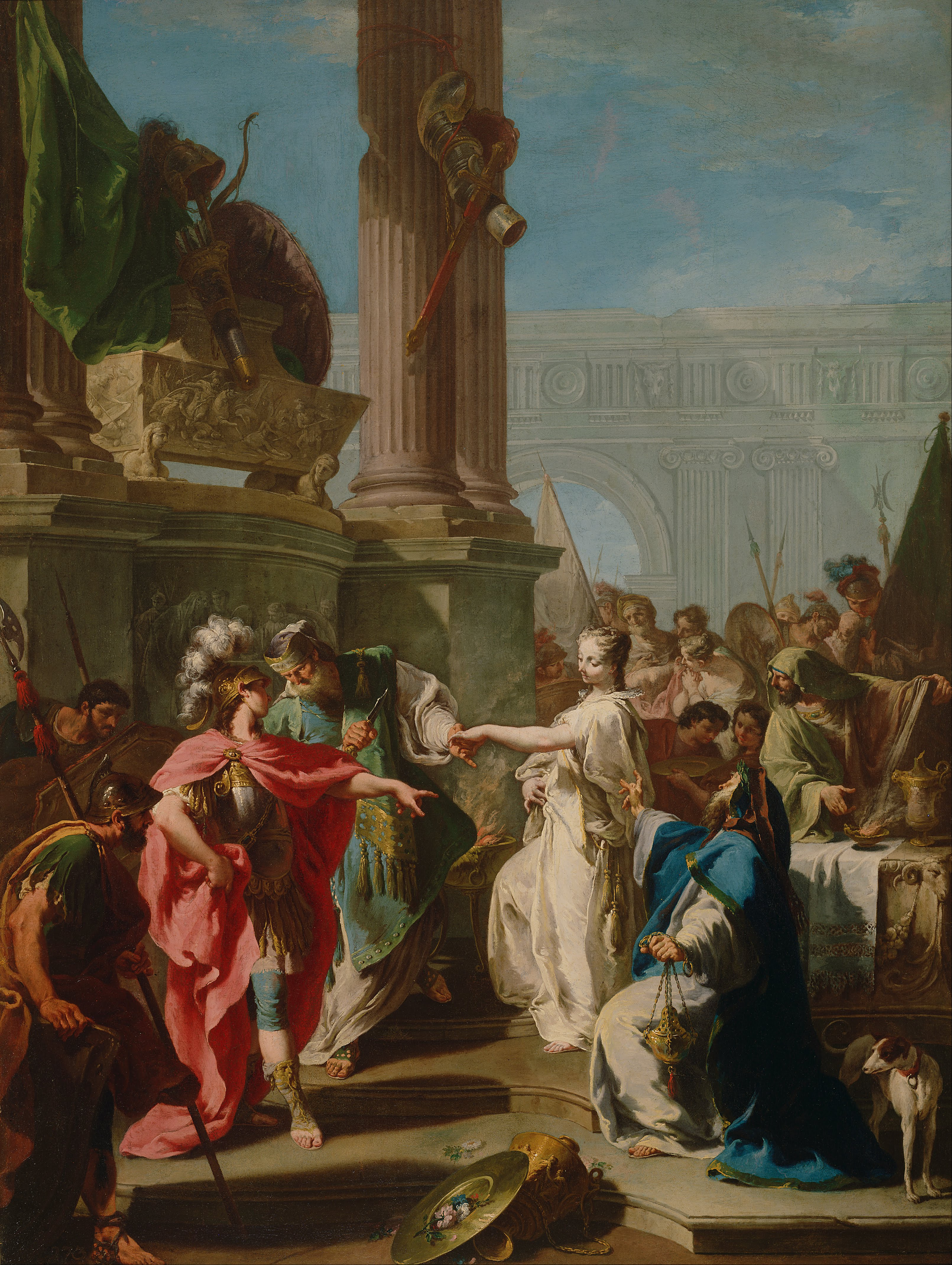
Giovanni Battista Pittoni, The Sacrifice of Polyxena, 1733–34

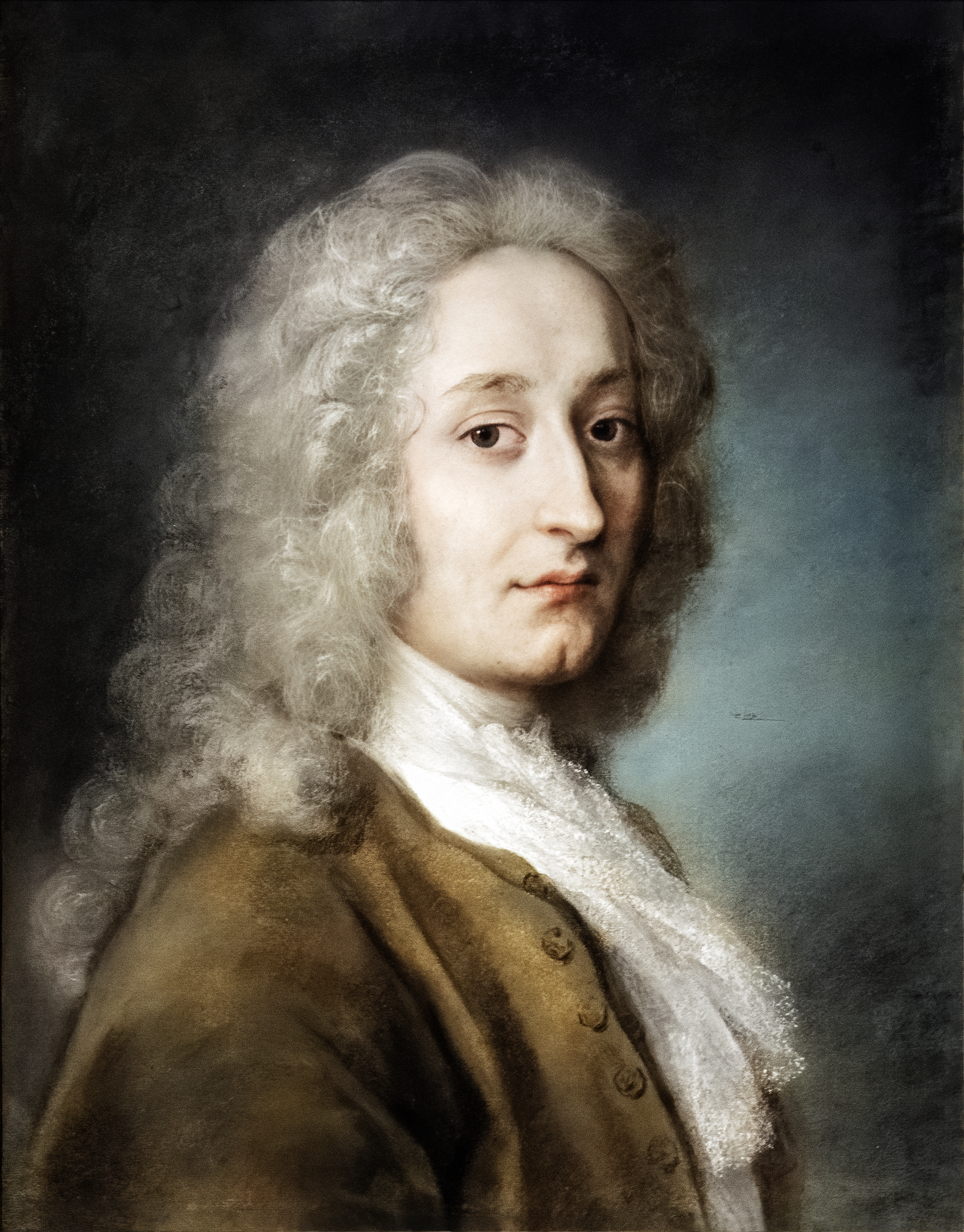
Rosalba Carriera, pastel portrait of Antoine Watteau, 1721

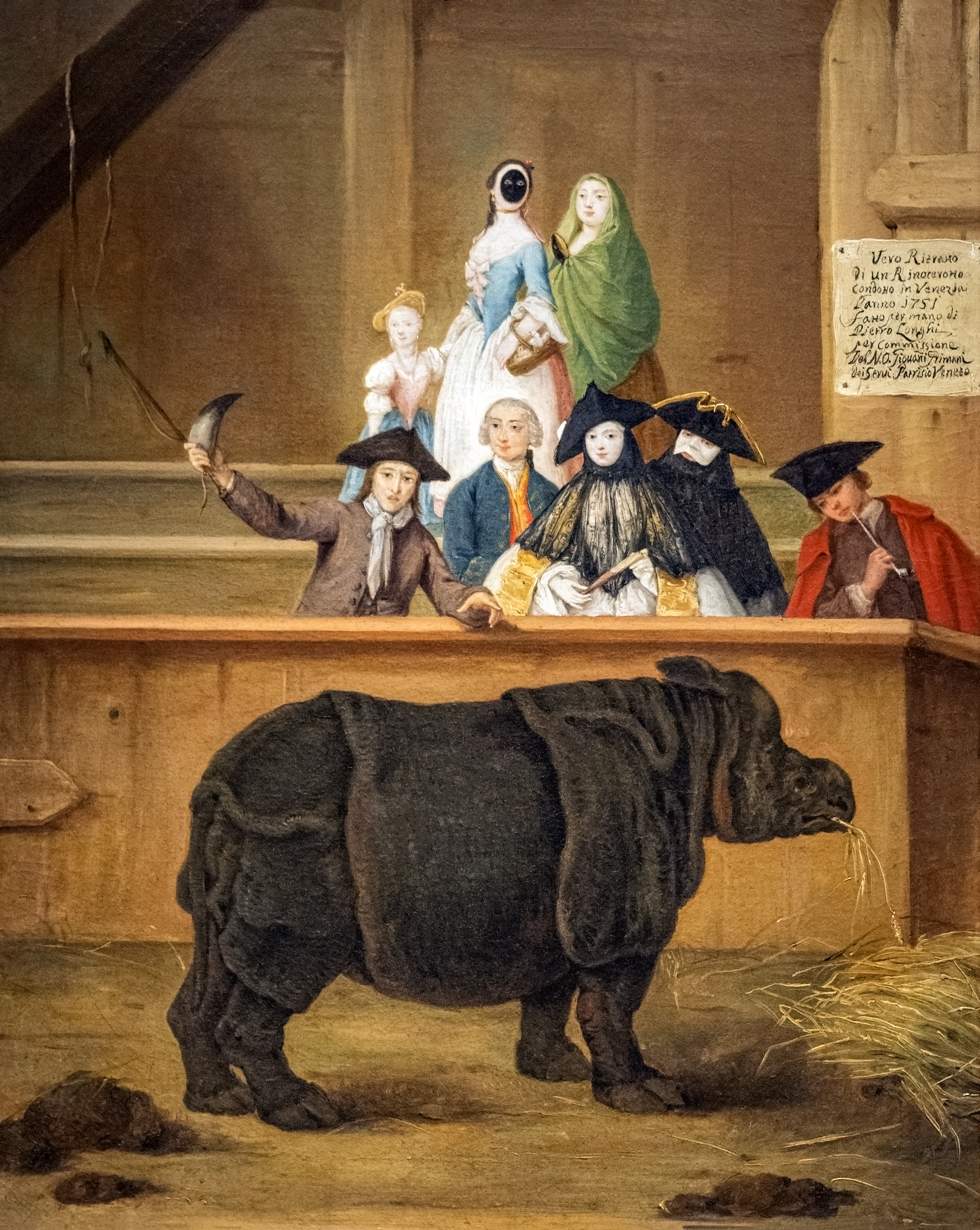
Clara the rhinoceros by Pietro Longhi, 1751

== Legacy ==
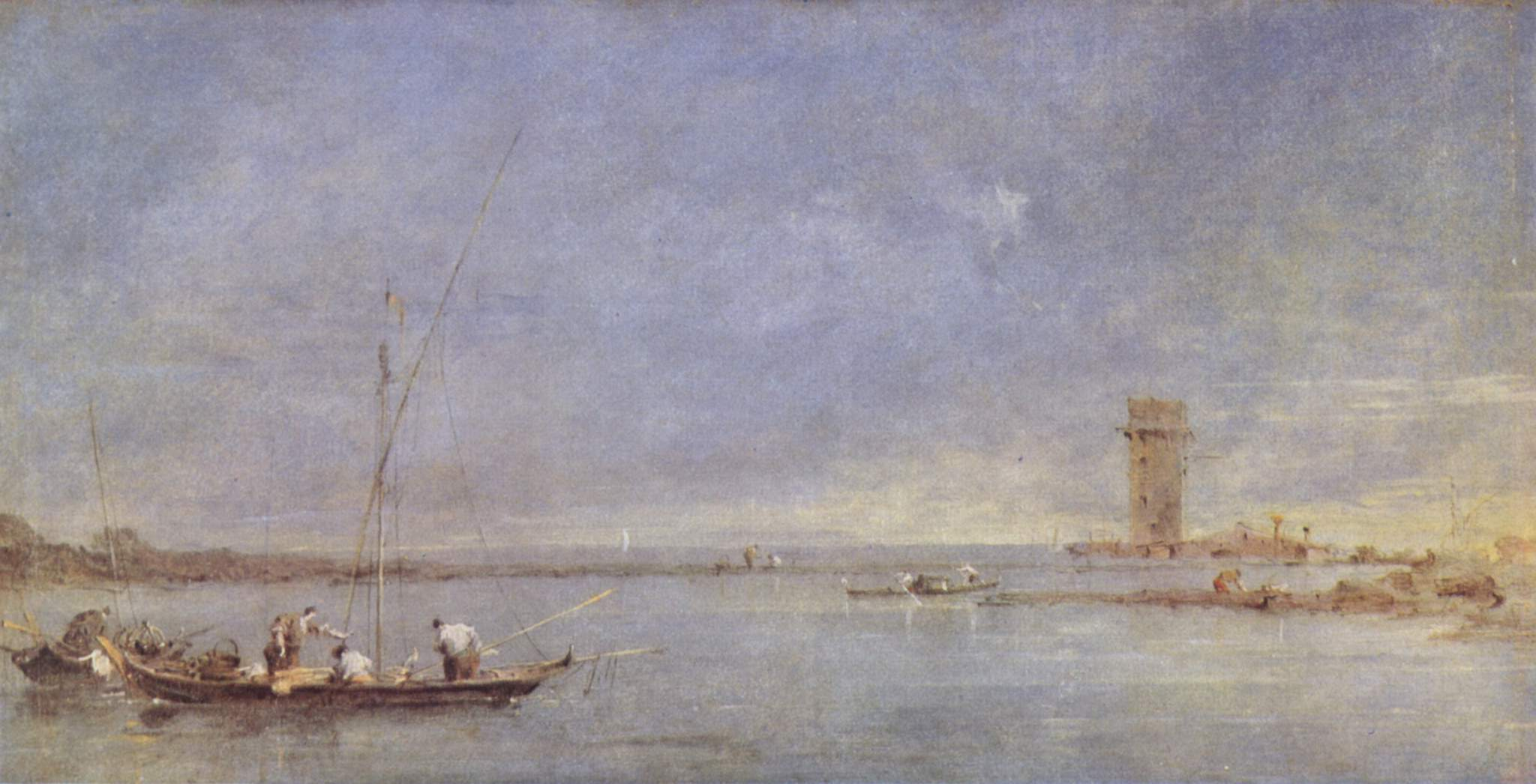
Francesco Guardi, View of the Venetian Lagoon with the Tower of Maghera, 1770s

The Venetian school had a great influence on subsequent painting, and the history of later Western art has been described as a dialogue between the more intellectual and sculptural/linear approach of the Florentine and Roman traditions, and the more sensual, poetic, and pleasure-seeking of the colourful Venetian school. Specifically through the presence of Titians in Spain (he was careful to avoid going there in person), the Venetian style influenced later Spanish art, especially in portraits, including that of Velázquez, and through Rubens was more broadly transmitted through the rest of Europe.

Venice as a subject for visiting artists has been extremely popular, especially from shortly after Venetian artists ceased to be significant. Among the best known to frequently depict the city are J. M. W. Turner, James Abbott McNeill Whistler and Claude Monet.

== See also ==
- List of painters and architects of Venice
