= List of paintings by Tintoretto =

The following is a list of paintings by the Italian artist Tintoretto, arranged chronologically. They are all oil on canvas unless otherwise noted.

== 1530s-1550s ==
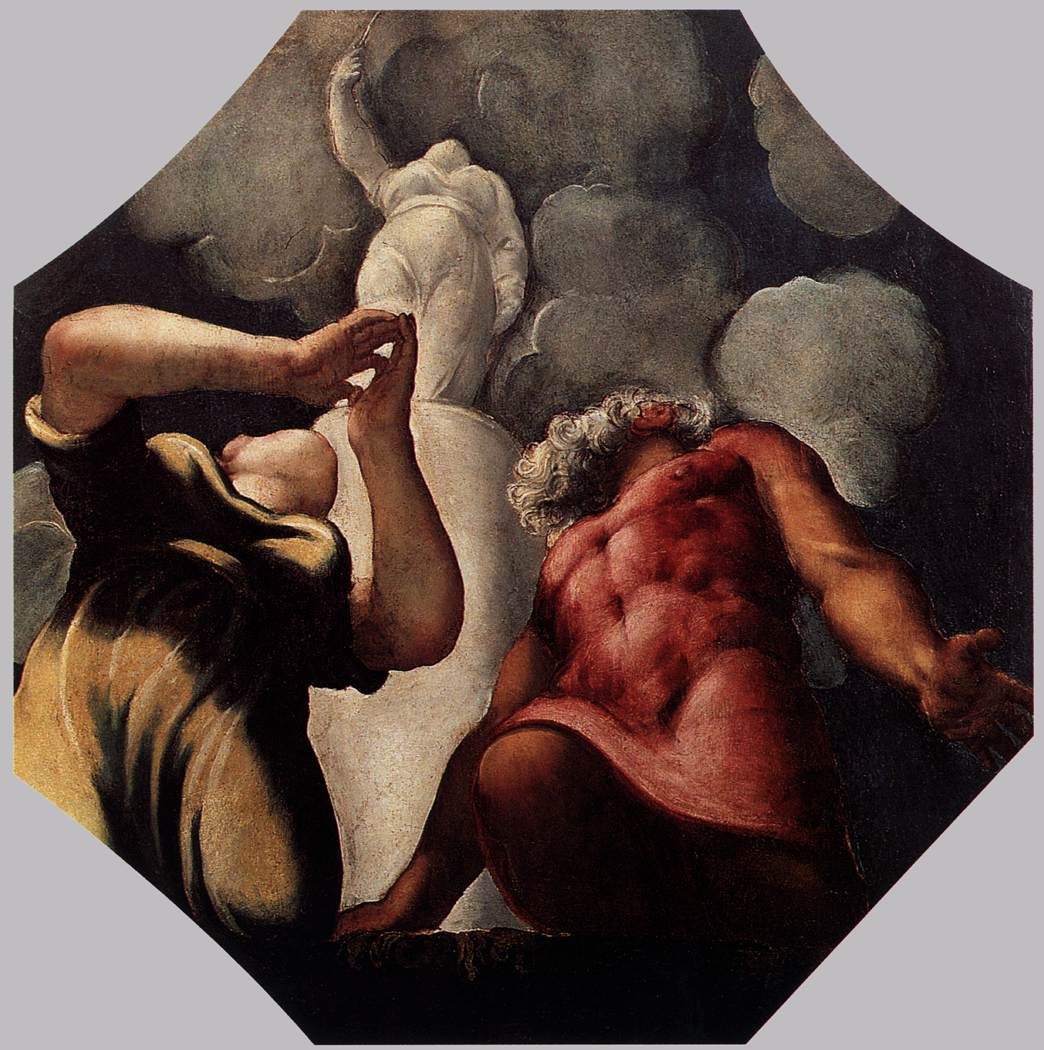
Deucalion and Pyrrha Praying Before a Statue of the Goddess Themis, 1541, Galleria Estense, Modena.

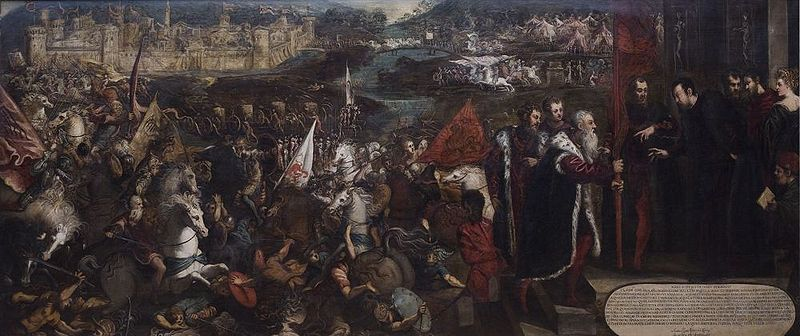
Siege of Asola

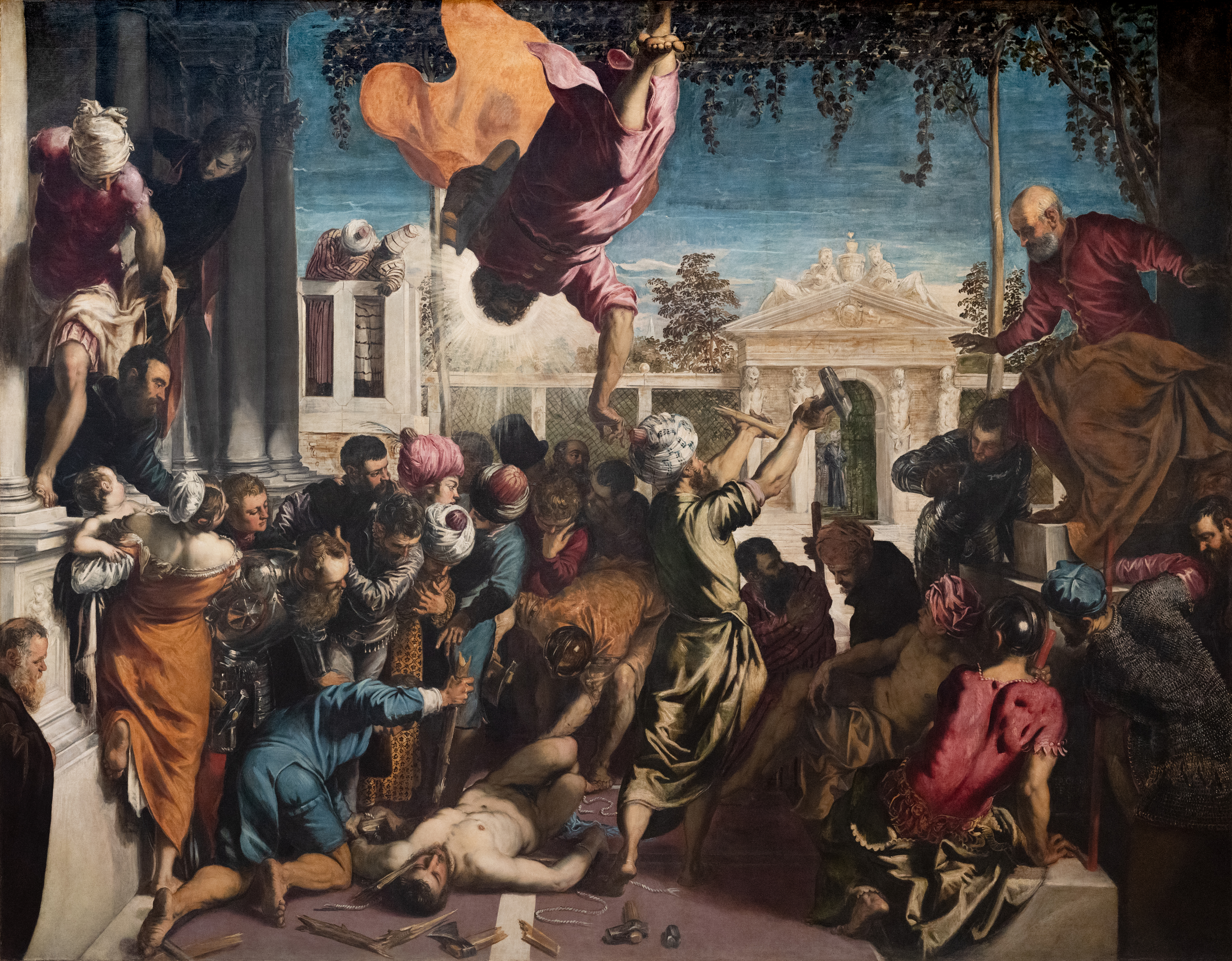
Miracle of the Slave

- Martyrdom of the Ten-Thousand, fragment, circa 1538, 138 × 218 cm, Gallerie dell'Accademia, Venice
- Madonna and Child with Saint Joseph, Saint Jerome and the Procurator Girolamo Marcello, 1539, 148 × 193 cm, private collection
- Adoration of the Shepherds, circa 1540, 172 × 274 cm, Fitzwilliam Museum, Cambridge
- Modena ceilings, 1541-1542, Galleria Estense, Modena
  - Apollo and Daphen
  - Pyramus and Thisbe
  - Latona Turns the Peasaants of Lycia into Frogs
  - Apollo and Marsyas
  - Semele Burned to Death
  - Fall of Phaeton, 153 × 133 cm
  - Deucalion and Pyrrha
  - Mercury and Argus
  - Orpheus Begging Pluto
  - Niobe and her Daughters
  - Antiope and Jupiter, 127 × 123 cm
  - Venus, Vulcan and Cupid
  - Fall of Icarus
  - Rape of Europa, 126 × 124 cm
- Christ Disputing with the Doctors, circa 1542-1543, 197 × 319 cm, Museo del Duomo, Milan
- Supper at Emmaus, circa 1542-1544, 156 × 212 cm, Museum of Fine Arts, Budapest,
- Venus and Adonis, 1543-1544, 145 × 272 cm, Uffizi, Florence
- The Siege of Asola, 1544-1545, 197 × 467,5 cm, private collection
- Mystic Marriage of St Catherine with Saint Augustine, Saint Mark and Saint John the Baptist, circa 1545, 193 x 314 cm, Musée des Beaux-Arts, Lyon
- Bible Stories of Vienna, circa 1544-1545, 29 × 157 cm, Kunsthistorisches Museum, Vienna,
  - Solomon and the Queen of Sheba
  - Conversion of Belshazzar
  - Bearing the Ark of the Covenant
  - David Preaching
  - David and Bathsheba
  - Samson's Revenge
- Conversion of Saul, circa 1545, 152 × 236 cm, National Gallery of Art, Washington
- The Queen of Sheba Visits Solomon, 1545-1546, 150 × 237,5 cm, Bob Jones University, Greenville
- Ecce homo, 1546-1547, 109 × 136 cm, Museu de Arte, São Paulo, Brazil
- Christ and the Woman Caught in Adultery, circa 1546, 119 × 168 cm, Roma, Palazzo Barberini, Galleria nazionale d'arte antica
- Self-Portrait, 1546–48, 45 × 38 cm, Philadelphia Museum of Art
- Christ Washes the Disciples' Feet, circa 1547, 210 × 533 cm, Museo del Prado, Madrid
- Portrait of Procurator Nicolò Priuli, circa 1547, 125 × 105 cm, Ca' d'Oro, Galleria Franchetti, Venice
- Miracle of the Slave, 1548, 415 × 541 cm, Gallerie dell'Accademia, Venice
- Saint Roch Healing Plague Victims, 1549, 307 × 673 cm, San Rocco, Venice
- Saint Martialis in Glory with Saint Peter and Saint Paul, 1548-1549, 376×181 cm, San Marziale, Venice
- The Miracle of Saint Augustine, 1549-1550, 255 x 174.5 cm, Museo Civico di Palazzo Chiericati, Vicenza.

== 1550s-1560s ==
- Christ and the Woman Caught in Adultery, circa 1550, 158 × 277 cm, Museo diocesano, Milan
- Visitation, circa 1550, 256 × 153 cm, Pinacoteca Nazionale di Bologna
- Portrait of Procurator Jacopo Soranzo, circa 1550, 106 × 90 cm, Gallerie dell'Accademia, Venice
- Portrait of Girolamo Pozzo, circa 1550, 111,8 × 93,9 cm, Royal Collection. Windsor Castle
- Christ and the Woman Caught in Adultery, circa 1550, 160 × 225 cm, Rijksmuseum, Amsterdam,
- Mars and Venus Surprised by Vulcan, circa 1551-1552, 135 × 198 cm, Alte Pinakothek, Munich
- Venus and Vulcan Doting on Cupid, 197 x 85, Galleria Palatina di Palazzo Pitti, Florence
- Doors to the organ case for the church of Santa Maria dell'Orto, 1552-1556, church of Santa Maria dell'Orto, Venice
  - Presentation of the Virgin in the Temple, 429 × 480 cm
  - Saint Peter's Vision of the Cross, 420 × 240 cm
  - Beheading of Saint Paul, 430 × 240 cm
- Paintings for the Scuola della Trinità, Venice, now in the Gallerie dell'Accademia
  - Creation of the Animals, 1550-1553, 151 × 258 cm
  - Creation of Adam and Eve, 1550-1553, 151 × 258 cm
  - Temptation of Adam and Eve, 1550-1553, 150 × 220 cm
  - Adam and Eve Before God, 1550-1553, 90 × 110 cm
  - Cain Kills Abel, 1550-1553, olio su tela, 149 × 196 cm
- Paintings for the Palazzo dei Camerlenghi in Venice
  - Saint Louis of Toulouse and Saint George, circa 1553, 225 × 145 cm, Gallerie dell'Accademia, Venice
  - Saint Andrew and Saint Jerome, circa 1553, 225 × 145 cm, Gallerie dell'Accademia, Venice
- Portrait of a Young Gentleman, circa 1553, 1025 × 89 cm, Galleria Doria Pamphilj, Rome
- Nativity of Saint John the Baptist, circa 1550, 181 × 226 cm, Hermitage Museum, Saint Petersburg
- Saint Nicholas of Bari, 1554-1555, 114 × 56 cm, Kunsthistorisches Museum, Vienna
- Paintings for the chiesa dei crociferi
  - Presentation of Christ at the Temple, 1554-1556, 239 × 298 cm, Gallerie dell'Accademia, Venice
  - Assumption of the Virgin, 1555, 440 × 260 cm, Chiesa di Santa Maria Assunta detta I Gesuiti, Venice
- Scenes from the Bible, circa 1555, Museo del Prado, Madrid
  - Susanna and the Elders, 58 × 116 cm
  - Esther Before Ahasuerus, 59 × 203 cm
  - Judith and Holofernes, 58 × 119 cm
  - Solomon and the Queen of Sheba, 58 × 205 cm
  - Joseph and Potiphar's Wife, 54 × 117 cm
  - Moses Saves from the Waters, 56 × 119 cm
- Portrait of a Man in Armour, 1555-1556, 116 × 99 cm, Kunsthistorisches Museum, Vienna
- Resurrection of Christ, circa 1555, 201 × 139 cm, Queensland Art Gallery, Brisbane,
- Lamentation over the Dead Christ, 1555-1556, Museo civico Amedeo Lia, La Spezia
- Lamentation over the Dead Christ, 1555-1559, 51 x 75 cm, Museo Soumaya, Mexico City
- The Deliverance of Arsinoe, circa 1556, 153 × 251 cm, Gemäldegalerie Alte Meister, Dresden
- Susanna and the Elders, circa 1557, 147 × 194 cm, Kunsthistorisches Museum, Vienna
- Christ Taken Down from the Cross, 1556-1558, 135,6 × 102 cm, Musée des Beaux-Arts, Caen
- Saint George and the Dragon, circa 1558, 158 × 100 cm, National Gallery, London
- Doors of the organ case for Santa Maria del Giglio, Venice, circa 1557-1558
  - Conversion of Saul, lost
  - Saint Luke and Saint Matthew, 259 × 150 cm
  - Saint Mark and Saint John the Evangelist, 257 × 150 cm
- Tarquinius and Lucretia, circa 1559, 175,5 × 152 cm, The Art Institute, Chicago

== 1560s-1570s ==
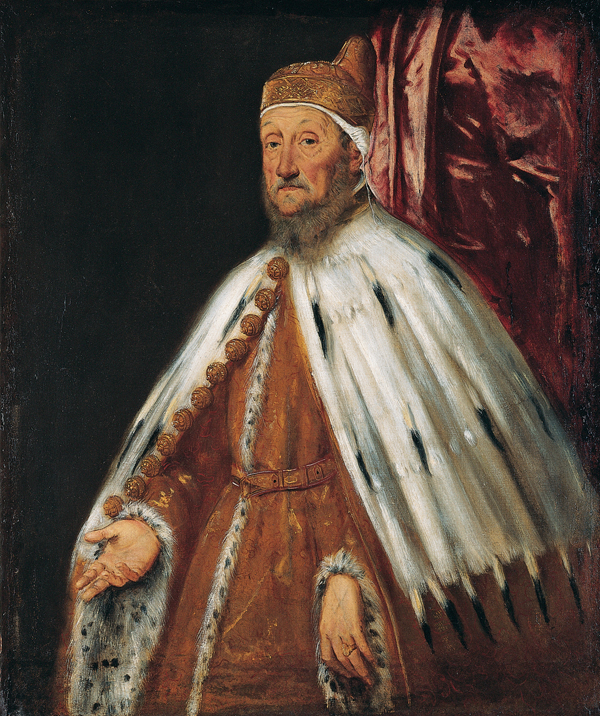
Portrait of Doge Pietro Loredan (Kimbell Art Museum, Fort Worth, Texas).

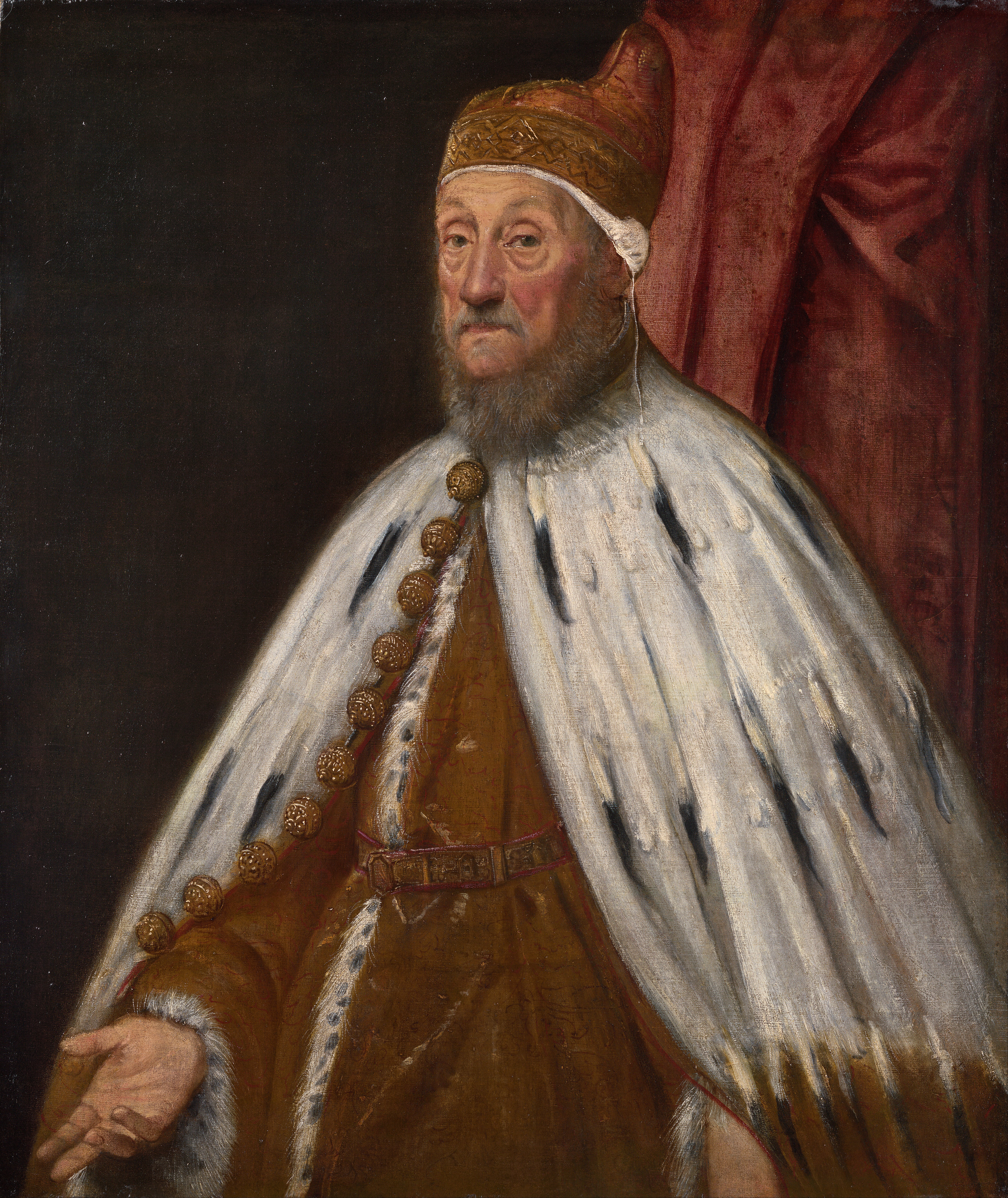
Portrait of Doge Pietro Loredan, National Gallery of Victoria, Melbourne.

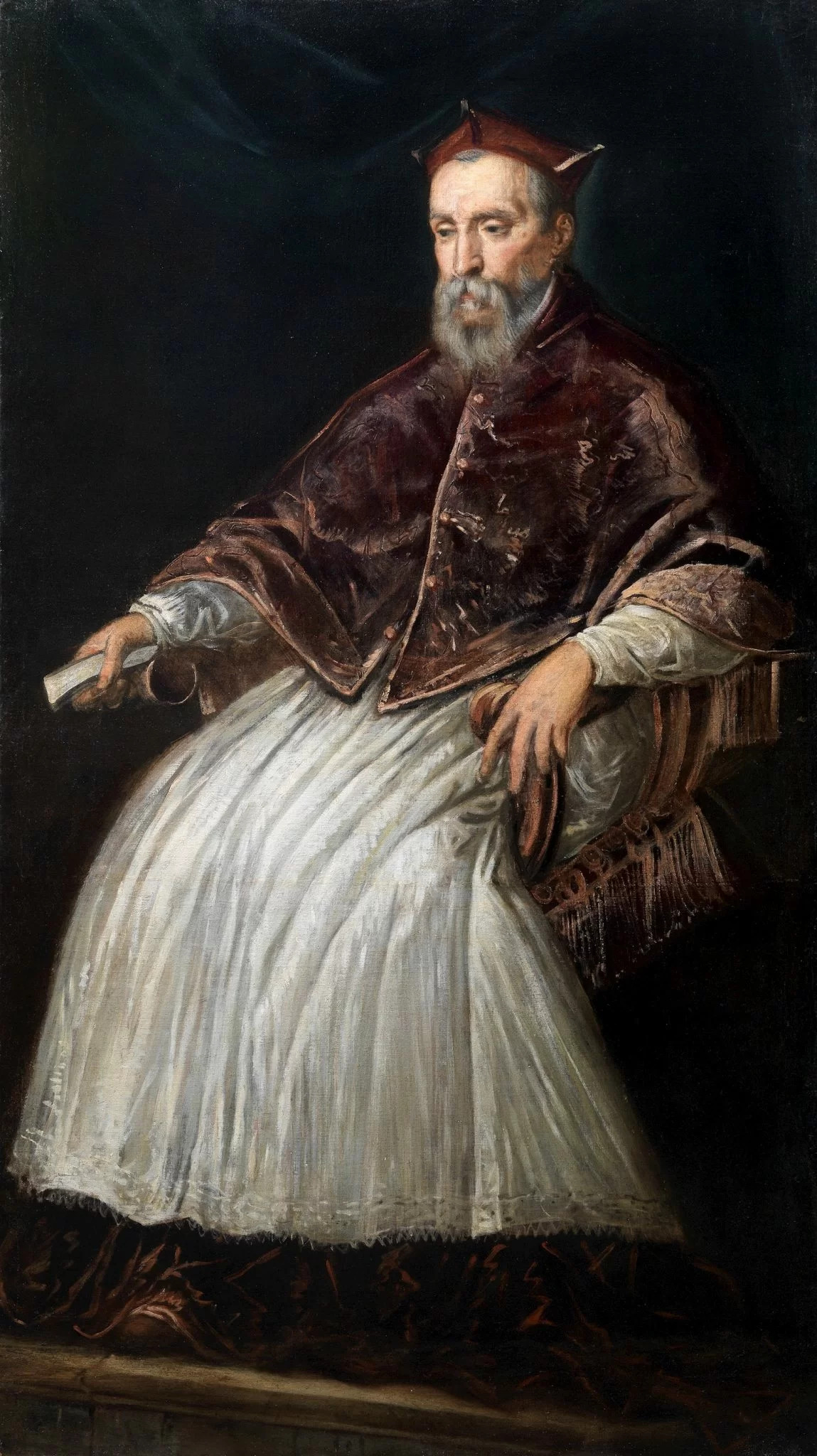
Portrait of cardinal Marco Antonio Da Mula, private collection

- Portrait of Doge Girolamo Priuli, 1560, 102 × 84 cm, Gallerie dell'Accademia, Venice
- Saint Helen and Saint Barbara Adoring the Cross, circa 1560, 275 × 165 cm, Pinacoteca di Brera, Milan
- Portrait of Alvise Cornaro, circa 1560-1565, 113 × 85 cm, Galleria Palatina, Florence
- Lamentation over the Dead Christ circa 1560-1565, 94.7 x 141 cm, São Paulo Museum of Art, Brazil,
- Portrait of procurator Antonio Cappello, circa 1561, 114 × 80 cm, Gallerie dell'Accademia, Venice
- Christ Washes the Disciples' Feet, (second version), circa 1566, 200,6 × 408,3 cm, National Gallery, London
- Deposition from the Cross, circa 1560, 227 × 294 cm, Gallerie dell'Accademia, Venice (Note: Previously in the demolished church of Santa Maria dell'Umiltà)
- Wedding Feast at Cana, 1561, 435 × 535 cm, Venezia, Basilica di Santa Maria della Salute
- Portrait of Cardinal Marco Antonio Da Mula, 1562-1563, 187 × 103 cm, private collection (Note: Appeared in the autumn edition of the TEFAF fair in New York (27-31 October 2018))
- Paintings for the Scuola Grande di San Marco
  - Rediscovery of Saint Mark's Body, 1562-1566, 396 × 400 cm, Pinacoteca di Brera, Milan
  - Saint Mark's Body Brought to Venice, 1562-1566, 398 × 315 cm, Gallerie dell'Accademia, Venice
  - Saint Mark Saves a Saracen during a Shipwreck, 1562-1566, 398 × 337 cm, Gallerie dell'Accademia, Venice
- Paintings for the choir of the church of Madonna dell'Orto, 1562-1564, church of Santa Maria dell'Orto, Venice
  - Worshipping the Golden Calf, 1450 × 580 cm
  - Last Judgement, 1450 × 590 cm
  - Temperance, 450 × 240 cm
  - Justice, 450 × 240 cm
  - Faith, 450 × 240 cm
  - Prudence, 450 × 240 cm
  - Courage, 450 × 240 cm
- Pietà, 1563, 108 × 170 cm, Milan, Pinacoteca di Brera
- Resurrection of Christ with Saint Cassian and Saint Cecilia, 1565, 450 x 225 cm, church of San Cassiano, Venice
- Paintings for the Sala dell'Albergo in the Scuola Grande di San Rocco, 1564-1567, Scuola Grande di San Rocco, Venice
  - Ceiling
    - Saint Roch in Glory, 1564, 240 × 360 cm
    - Spring, 1564, 90 cm in diameter
    - Summer, 1564, 90 cm in diameter
    - Autumn, 1564, 90 cm in diameter
    - Winter, 1564, 90 cm in diameter
    - Allegory of the School of Saint John the Evangelist, 1564, 90 × 190 cm
    - Allegory of the School of Pity, 1564, 90 × 190 cm
    - Allegory of the School of Charity, 1564, 90 × 190 cm
    - Allegory of the School of Saint Mark, 1564, 90 × 190 cm
    - Allegory of the School of Saint Theodore, 1564, 90 × 190 cm
    - Happiness, 1564, 90 × 190 cm
    - Goodness, 1564, 90 × 190 cm
    - Generosity, 1564, 90 × 190 cm
    - Hope, 1564, 90 × 190 cm
    - Faith, 1564, 90 × 190 cm
- Christ's Body Borne to the Sepulchre, circa 1565, 164 × 124 cm, National Gallery of Scotland, Edinburgh
  - Walls
    - Crucifixion, 1565, 536 × 1224 cm
    - Christ on the Way to Calvary, 1565-1567, 515 × 390 cm
    - Ecce Homo, 1566–67, 260 × 390 cm
    - Christ Before Pilate, 1566–67, 515 × 380 cm
- Portrait of Jacopo Sansovino, circa 1566, 49 × 36 cm, Staatliche Kunstsammlungen, Weimar
- Portrait of Jacopo Sansovino, circa 1566, 70 × 65 cm, Galleria degli Uffizi, Florence
- Madonna of the Treasurers, circa 1566-1567, 221 × 521 cm, Gallerie dell'Accademia, Venice
- Trinity, 1564-1568, 122 × 181 cm, Galleria Sabauda, Turin
- Crucifixion, 1568, 341 × 371 cm, church of San Cassiano, Venice
- Descent into Limbo, 1568, 342 × 373 cm, church of San Cassiano, Venice
- Paintings for the chancel of the church of San Rocco, 1567, church of San Rocco, Venice
  - Saint Roch in Prison Comforted by an Angel, 300 × 670 cm
  - Saint Roch Healing the Animals, 230 × 670 cm
  - Saint Roch in the Desert, 230 × 670 cm
- Portrait of Ottavio Strada, 1567, 128 × 101 cm, Rijksmuseum, Amsterdam
- Christ in the House of Martha and Mary, 1567, 197,5 × 131 cm, Alte Pinakothek, Munich
- Portrait of Doge Pietro Loredan, 1568-1570, 126 × 106,6 cm, Kimbell Art Museum, Fort Worth (Texas),
- Portrait of Doge Pietro Loredan, 1568-1570, 107 × 91 cm, National Gallery of Victoria, Melbourne,
- Portrait of Doge Pietro Loredan, 1568-1570, 125 × 100 cm, Museum of Fine Arts, Budapest

== 1570s-1580s ==
- Christ Calming the Storm on the Sea of Galilee, circa 1570, 117.1 × 169,2 cm, National Gallery of Art, Washington,
- Danaë, circa 1570, 142 × 182 cm, Musée des Beaux-Arts, Lyon
- Ultima Cena, circa 1570, 228 × 535 cm, San Polo, Venice
- Madonna and Child or Madonna of the Stars, early 1570s, 92,7 × 72,7 cm, National Gallery of Art, Washington
- Five Philosophers, 1570-1571, 250 × 160, Libreria Sansoviniana, Venice
- Portrait of Sebastiano Venier with a Page, circa 1572, 195 × 130 cm, Museo di Palazzo Mocenigo, Venice
- Madonna and Child with Saint Mark and Saint Luke, 1571-1572, 228 x 160 cm, Gemäldegalerie, Berlin
- Madonna and Child, circa 1572-1573, 100 × 131 cm, Fine Arts Museums of San Francisco
- Madonna and Child with the Family of Doge Alvise Mocenigo, circa 1573, 216 × 416,5 cm, National Gallery of Art, Washington
- Assumption, 1574-1576, Chiesa Santa Maria Maggiore, Miglionico (Matera)
- Susanna and the Elders, circa 1575, 150 × 103 cm, National Gallery of Art, Washington
- The Origin of the Milky Way, 1575-1580, 148 × 165 cm, National Gallery, London
- Paintings for the Anticollegio of the Doge's Palace, Venice, 1576-1577
  - Three Graces with Mercury, 146 × 155 cm
  - Ariadne, Venus and Bacchus, 146 × 167 cm
  - Minerva Driving out Mars, 148 × 168
  - Vulcan's Forge, 145 × 156
- Temptation of Saint Antony, 1577, 282 × 165 cm, San Trovaso, Venice
- Angel of the Annunciation, 1578, 115 × 93 cm, Rijksmuseum, Amsterdam
- Virgin of the Annunciation, 1578, 119 × 93 cm, Rijksmuseum, Amsterdam
- Leda and the Swan, circa 1578, 162 × 218 cm, Uffizi, Florence
- The Muses, circa 1579, 2012 × 304 cm, Royal Collection, Windsor Castle
- Judith and Holofernes, circa 1579, 188 × 251 cm, Museo del Prado, Madrid
- Baptism of Christ, circa 1580, 283 x 162;cm, San Silvestro, Venice
- Paintings for the Scuola Grande di San Rocco, 1576-1581, Scuola Grande di San Rocco, Venice
  - Ceiling
    - Moses Sets up the Brazen Serpent, 840 × 520 cm
    - Moses Striking the Rock to Create a Fountain, 550 × 520 cm
    - Gathering the Manna, 550 × 520 cm
    - Original Sin, 265 × 370 cm
    - God Appearing to Moses, 370 × 265 cm
    - Column of Fire, 370 × 265 cm
    - Jonah Leaving the Belly of the Whale, 265 × 370 cm
    - Ezekiel's Vision, 660 × 265 cm
    - Jacob's Ladder, 660 × 265 cm
    - Sacrifice of Isaac, 265 × 370 cm
    - Elisha Multiplying the Loaves, 370 × 265 cm
    - Elijah Fed by an Angel, 370 × 265 cm
    - Passover of the Israelites, 265 × 370 cm
    - Abram and Melchizedek, 265 × 265 cm
    - Jeremiah's Vision, 265 × 265 cm
    - Elijah on the Chariot of Fire, 265 × 265 cm
    - Daniel Saved by an Angel, 265 × 265 cm
    - Samson Drawing Water from a Donkey's Jaw, 265 × 265 cm
    - Samuel and Saul, 265 × 265 cm
    - Moses Saved from the Waters, 265 × 265 cm
    - The Three Young Men in the Furnace, 265 × 265 cm
  - Walls
    - Saint Roch, 250 × 80 cm
    - Saint Sebastian, 250 × 80 cm
    - Adoration of the Shepherds, 542 × 455 cm
    - Baptism of Christ, 538 × 465 cm
    - Resurrection of Christ, 529 × 485 cm
    - The Agony in Gethsemane, 538 × 455 cm
    - Last Supper, 538 × 487
    - The Loaves and Fishes, 523 × 475 cm
    - Resurrection of Lazarus, 541 × 356
    - Ascension, 538 × 325
    - Christ Heals the Paralytic or Piscina probatica, 533 × 529 cm
    - Temptation of Christ, 539 × 330 cm
- Ceiling of the Sala delle Quattro Porte, 1578-1581, Doge's Palace, Venice
  - Jupiter Proclaims Venus Queen of the Seas, 500 × 290 cm
  - Juno Brings Venus the Signs of Power, 290 cm in diameter
  - Venice, Protector of Liberty, 290 cm in diameter
  - Treviso, 150 × 115 cm
  - Vicenza, 150 × 115 cm
  - Altino, 150 × 115 cm
  - Friuli, 150 × 115 cm
  - Padua, 150 × 115 cm
- Fasti of the Gonzagas, 1578-1580, Alte Pinakothek, Munich
  - Investiture of Gianfrancesco I, 272 × 432 cm
  - Ludovico III Defeats the Venetians near Legnago, 273 × 386 cm
  - Frederick I Liberates Legnano, 236 × 421 cm
  - Francesco II at the Battle of Taro, 269 × 421 cm
  - The Victorious Federico II Enters Milan, 206 × 334 cm
  - Frederick II Conquers Parma, 213 × 276 cm
  - Frederick II Conquers Pavia, 212 × 276 cm
  - Philip II Enters Mantua, 213 × 330 cm
  - Verona, 150 × 115 cm
  - Istria, 150 × 115 cm
  - Brescia, 150 × 115 cm

== 1580-1594 ==
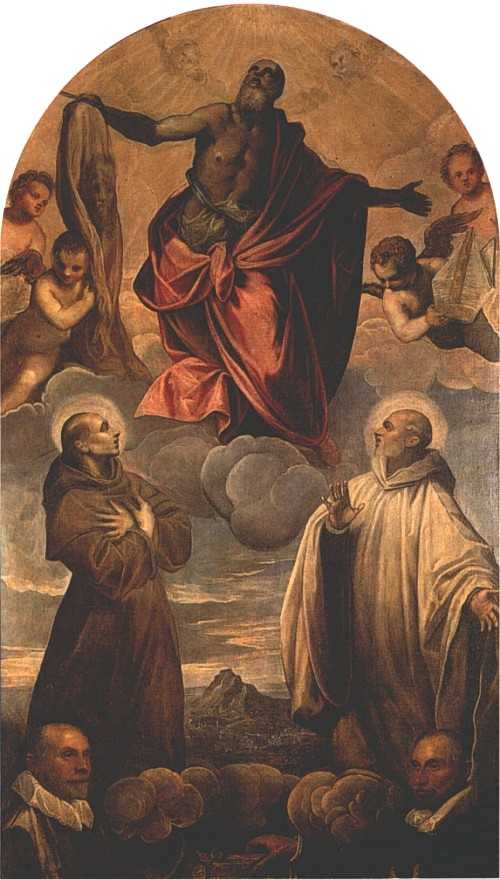
Saint Bartholomew, Saint Benedict and Blessed Bernardo Tolomei with the Commissioners Bartolomeo and Battista Malmignati - Sanctuary of the Madonna del Pilastrello, Lendinara.

- Saint Bartholomew, Saint Benedict and Blessed Bernardo Tolomei with the Commissioners Bartolomeo and Battista Malmignati, circa 1580, Sanctuary of the Madonna del Pilastrello, Lendinara
- The Vision of Saint Nicholas, c.1582, Novo Mesto Cathedral, Slovenia
- Portrait of Vincenzo Morosini, 1581-1582, 84,5 × 51,5 cm, National Gallery, London
- Baptism of Christ, 1581-1582, 169 × 251,4 cm, Cleveland Museum of Art, Cleveland, Ohio,
- Paintings for the Sala del Senato, 1581-1584, Doge's Palace, Venice
  - Triumph of Venice as Queen of the Seas, 810 × 420 cm
  - Doge Pietro Loredan before the Madonna, 380 × 360 cm
  - The Dead Christ Supported by Angels and Adored by Doges Pietro Lando and Marcantonio Trevisan, 295 × 910 cm
- Paintings for the Sala Inferiore, 1582-1587, Scuola Grande di San Rocco, Venice
  - Annunciation, 422 × 545 cm
  - Adoration of the Magi, 425 × 544 cm
  - Flight into Egypt, 422 × 580 cm
  - Massacre of the Innocents, 422 × 546 cm
  - Saint Mary Magdalene, 425 × 209 cm
  - Saint Mary of Egypt, 425 × 211 cm
  - Circumcision of Christ, 440 × 482 cm
  - Assumption of the Virgin, 425 × 587 cm
  - Visitation, circa 1588, 151 x 230 cm
- Self-Portrait, circa 1588, 63 × 52 cm, Louvre, Paris
- Adoration of the Magi, 1587, Santa Maria delle Vergini, Macerata
- Martyrdom of Saint Lawrence, 1588, 126 × 191 cm, Christ Church Picture Gallery, Oxford
- Paradise, 1588-1592, 700 × 2500 cm, Doge's Palace, Venice (Note: Largest oil on canvas painting in the world)
- Life of Saint Catherine, 1590-1592, Gallerie dell'Accademia, Venice
  - Saint Catherine Explaining to MaxentiusHer Reasons for Refusing to Adore Idols, 160 × 225 cm
  - Saint Catherine Disputing with the Doctors of Alexandria, 160 × 228 cm
  - Saint Catherine Whipped, 161 × 230 cm
  - Saint Catherine in Prison Assisted by Angels, 162 × 246 cm
  - The Martyrdom of Saint Catherine, 160 × 244 cm
  - Saint Catherine Led to the Place of Execution, 160 × 245 cm
- Last Supper, Lucca Cathedral, Lucca
- Paintings for San Giorgio Maggiore 1592-1594, Church of San Giorgio Maggiore, Venice
  - Gathering the Manna, 377 × 576 cm
  - Last Supper, 365 × 568 cm
  - Deposition of Christ, 288 × 166 cm

== Unknown date ==
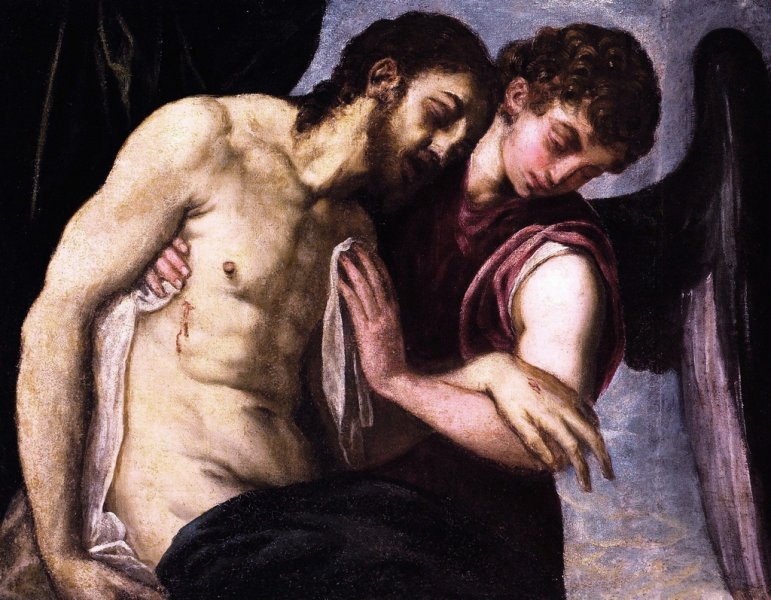
The Dead Christ Supported by an Angel, Galleria Nazionale di Arte Antica, Trieste.

- Crucifixion, Musei Civici agli Eremitani, Padua
- Incision, Casa della cultura, Palmi
- The Dead Christ Supported by an Angel, Galleria Nazionale di Arte Antica, Trieste

== Attributed works ==
- Saint Mark with Saint Jerome and Saint Bartholomew and Annunciation, Korčula Cathedral, Croatia
- Saint Christopher, Museo d'Arte Sacra San Martino, Alzano Lombardo
- Judgement of Paris, Palazzo Moroni, Padua
- The Cercopes Transformed into Monkeys, Palazzo Moroni, Padua
- Briseis Reproaches Achilles, Palazzo Moroni, Padua
- Deucalion and Pyrrha, Palazzo Moroni, Padua
- Apollo and Marsyas, Palazzo Moroni, Padua
- Venus and Adonis, Palazzo Moroni, Padua
- Venus Lamenting the Dead Adonis, Palazzo Moroni, Padua
- Jupiter and Semele, Palazzo Moroni, Padua.
