= List of Italian artworks in the National Museum of Serbia =

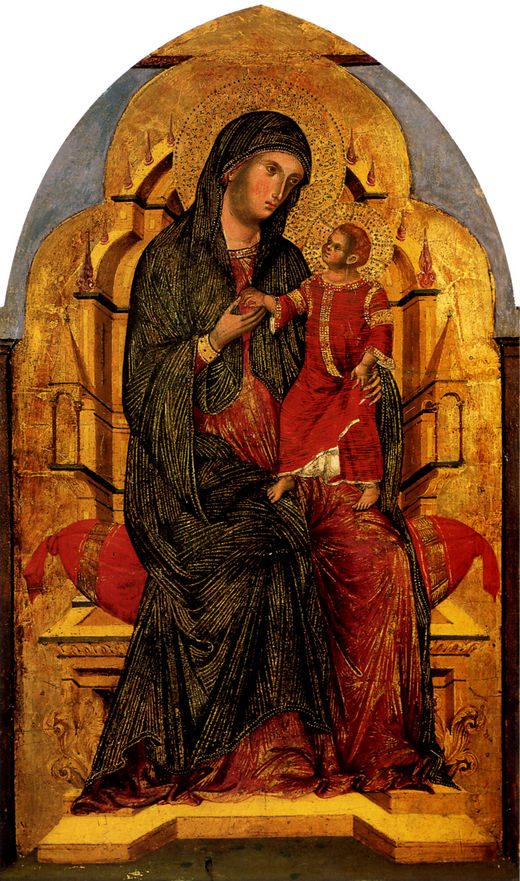
Madonna and Child, by Paolo Veneziano

The Italian Art Collection in National Museum of Serbia consisting of more than 230 works of art, is famous for containing creative works from individual masters and artistic workshops from the 14th to the 20th centuries. They include works by Domenico Veneziano, Giovanni di Paolo, Titian, Tintoretto, Vittore Carpaccio, Lorenzo di Credi, Guido Reni, Spinello Aretino, Francesco Bassano the Younger, Leandro Bassano, Giovanni Battista Tiepolo, Canaletto, Francesco Guardi, Giulio Carpioni, Andrea Celesti, Girolamo Muziano, Luigi Ontani, Guglielmo Achille Cavellini and Giuseppe Pinot-Gallizio. The graphic and etching collection includes work by Botticelli, Annibale Carracci, Giovanni Battista Piranesi, Paolo Veronese, Amedeo Modigliani, and others.

== Gothic and medieval ==
- Paolo Veneziano, Madonna and Child (Tempera on panel, c. 1324), Christ born (1320), Saint Paulus (tempera 59,7 x 22,5 cm - 1307)
- Bartolo di Fredi, Holy Father with Three Angels (polyptych)
- Paolo di Giovanni Fei, Madonna with Christ on the Throne (triptych 48 x 45 cm)
- Lorenzo Veneziano, Nativité (Tempera - 76.3 x 54.8 cm)
- Spinello Aretino, Madona and Christ (tempera, 113 x 64 cm, c. 1405)
- Giovanni Di Paolo, God and Three Angels (tempera 54 x 27 cm)
- Sassetta attributed, Saint Bernardino of Siena (15. century) tempera

== Renaissance ==
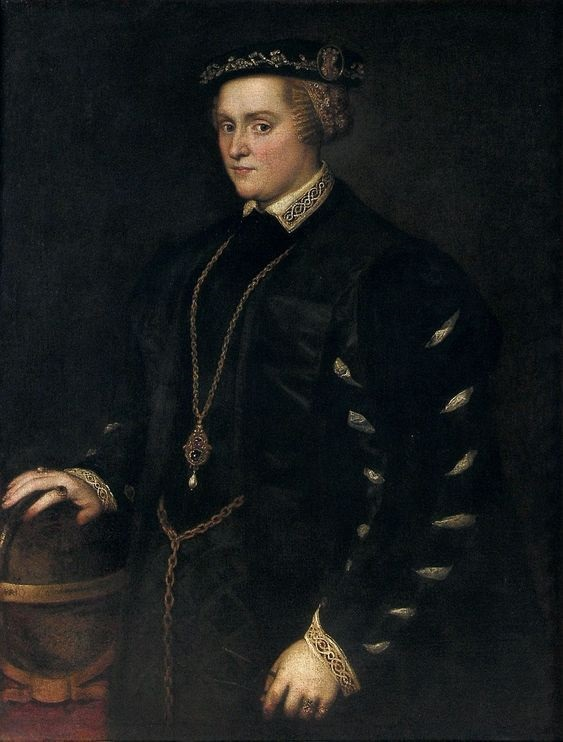
Portrait of Queen Christina of Denmark, by Titian

- Francesco da Cotignola, Passed Christ with Angels (1510)
- Raphael or follower, Madonna with Christ and small St.John, 114x116cm
- Lorenzo di Credi, Adoration (d: 96 cm - tempera, c. 1500)
- Palma il Giovane, Saint Lorenzo, Old Man from left and Old Man from right
- Bartolomeo Ramenghi, Madona and Christ (oil on canvas - 59 x 50 cm, c. 1504)
- Antonio Solario, Entering Jerusalem (tempera on wood)
- Andrea Solari, Christ Ecce Hommo
- Bologna School 16th century Saint Bernadino the Sienesse (tempera 95x48cm)
- Giovanni Bellini follower, Madonna with small Christ (oil on panel 85 x 59,5 cm)
- Pietro Testa, Interior with Group and Sculpture
- Ludovico Brea, Magnification of Christ (attributed)
- Vittore Carpaccio, Holy Pilgrim (110x37cm-part of polyptych) and St. Sebastian (108 x 36 cm - 1495 - part of polyptych)
- Titian, Nicolas Vicarius Portrait (canvas 200x100cm), Portrait of Queen Christina of Denmark (Oil on canvas - 110 x 83 cm)
- Sofonisba Anguissola, Portrait of Young Woman, (miniature 8x7cm, tempera on ivory)
- Francesco Bassano the Younger, Christ in the Garden of Olives (oil on canvas 90 x 74 cm) and Passed Christ with Two Angels (canvas 148x99cm)
- Jacopo Bassano, (attribution) Mourning for Christ (canvas)
- Leandro Bassano, Moses Miracle over Spring (oil on canvas - 77 x 108 cm), Angel Appears to Pastors (oil on canvas- 78 x1 08 cm)
- Girolamo da Treviso, Pastor Worship
- Tintoretto, Madonna and Child with Donor (oil on canvas, d: 158 cm, 1524)
- Domenico Robusti, Portrait of Venetian (canvas 200x127cm)
- Francesco Curradi, Saint Cecile (canvas 74x59cm)
- Pietro Damini, Moaning to Christ
- Luca Cambiasi, Madona and child (oil on canvas, d: 97.5 x 77.5 cm, 1555)
- Alessandro Varotari, Artemisia (oil on canvas - 80 x 111 cm), Three Puttas (canvas)
- Felice Riccio, The Multiplication of Bread and Fish (Oil on canvas, 146 x 179 cm c. 1576)

== Baroque ==
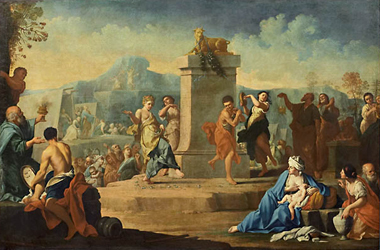
Dance around Golden Calf, by Giuseppe Gambarini

- Leonello Spada, Judith and Halophen (canvas 220x150cm)
- Giovanni Lanfranco, Healing of Blind Man (attributed)
- Giacinto Campana, Madonna Birth (canvas 135 x 191,5 x 2 cm)
- Giovanni Domenico Cerrini, David receiving King's Insignia (canvas 144x209cm)
- Alessandro Turchi, Madonna with small Christ and St.Francis (oil on panel- 30 x 25 cm)
- Bernardo Strozzi, The Saint Cecile (58 x 46 cm, oil on canvas)
- Pierfrancesco Cittadini, Still Life with Dragonfly
- Alessandro Tiarini, Crossifing (oil on canvas - 162 x 98 cm c. 1632)
- Andrea Celesti, Adoration of Sage, Adoration (attributed)
- Daniele Crespi, Passed Christ
- Mattia Preti, attribution, Moving Christ from Cross
- Antonio Maria Vassallo, Abraham's Departure from Haran to the Land of Canaan (oil on canvas, 110 x 160 cm)
- Giovan Battista Langetti, Saint Jeronim (oil on canvas - 84 x 76 cm, c:1658)
- Francesco Cairo, Pandora (137x117cm canvas)
- Antonio Zanchi, Bacco and Venera (oil on canvas - 112 x 121 cm)
- Giulio Carpioni, Mercure hold a Bat (oil on canvas 71 x 58 cm, 1660–1670), Separating Ground from Water
- Sebastiano Ricci, Agripinha Death (canvas 160x216cm)
- Alessandro Magnasco, Landscape with Saint John (oil on canvas - 126 x 110 cm)
- Nicola Bertucci, Samson and Dahlila (canvas 168x129cm)
- Francesco Maria Raineri, Kain and Abell, Loth with Daughters
- Luca Carlevarijs manner, Small Port
- Antiveduto Grammatica, Madonna with Christ and Saint Ann (canvas 104x118cm)
- Giuseppe Gambarini, Dance Around the Golden Calf (oil on canvas - 150 x 231 cm)
- Lorenzo De Caro, Madonna Resurrection (100x72cm canvas)
- Antonio Balestra's workshop (Giovanni Battista Mariotti), Isac's Sacrifice and Prophet Vision
- Jacopo Amigoni, Christ and Samaritian Girl (oil on canvas - 96 x 73 cm,)
- Michele Rocca, Venus with Puttas (canvas 37x47cm)
- Pietro Rotari, (3 pastels), Young Woman in Blue Dress, Young Man in Blue West and Young Lady in Black

== Rococo ==
- Giovanni Battista Tiepolo, Saint Family, Collecting Mana attributed (oil on canvas)
- Giuseppe Bazzani, Apostle Prince and Paul arriving on Scaffold and Crucifix
- Giuseppe Nogari, Jesus and a Samaritan woman at a well
- Canaletto, A view of the Grand Canal (oil on canvas 60 x 95 cm)
- Francesco Guardi, Plaza San Marco, Venice (oil on canvas 75 x 99 cm -1765)
- Michele Marieschi, Santa Maria de la Salute (oil on canvas)
- School of Ferrara, Madonna and Child with Angels (16th century), The Christ Death (16th century), Crossifing of Saint Peter (oil on canvas - 162 x 130 cm - 17th century), Crossifing of Saint Andreus (oil on canvas 162 x 130 cm - 17th century)
- Donato Creti, Judita with Halofen's head (oil on canvas - 115 x 91 cm)
- Francesco Zuccarelli, Landscape, Landscape with river
- Nicola Bertucci, Sampson and Dahlila
- Ercole Graziani the Younger, The Battle
- Francesco Solimena, Madona in Pain with Angel (oil on canvas - 76 x 63 cm)

== Modern ==
- Giuseppe Tominz, Portrait of Unknown Man
- Fausto Zonaro, Constantinopole Port I and Constantinopole Port II
- Domenico Morelli, Sick Woman (canvas)
- Alfredo Müller, Italian Town (canvas)
- Giovanni Fattori, Horseman with Two Drummers (canvas)
- Amedeo Modigliani, Portrait of Moise Kisling (drawing), Female Act (drawing)
- Eso Peluzzi, On The Shore (canvas)
