= Assumption of the Virgin (Tintoretto) =

Painting by Jacopo Tintoretto

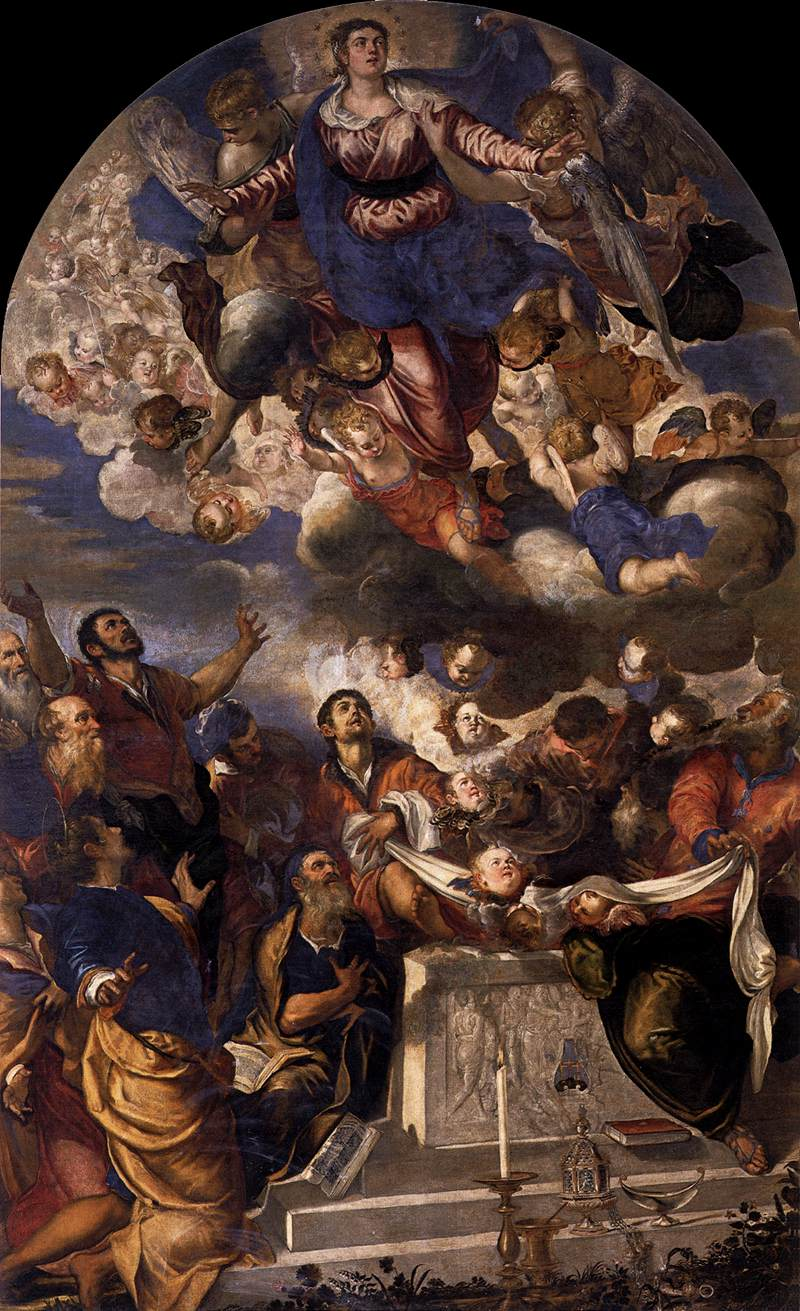
Assumption of the Virgin (c. 1555) by Tintoretto

Assumption of the Virgin is a c.1555 oil on canvas painting by Tintoretto, now in the church I Gesuiti. It and Presentation at the Temple (Gallerie dell'Accademia) were both originally painted for the church of Santa Maria dei Crociferi. Its colouring is similar to that of Paolo Veronese and Carlo Ridolfi wrote of it that originally Veronese had gained the commission for it before Tintoretto took it from him by promising to produce the work in Veronese's style.

== Bibliography ==
- (in Italian) Robert Echols and Frederik Ilchman (ed.s), Tintoretto 1519 - 1594, Marsilio, 2018, ISBN 978-88-317-1135-7.
- (in Italian) Carlo Bernardi, L'opera completa del Tintoretto, Milano, Rizzoli, 1970.
- (in Italian) Marina Sennato, Dizionario Larousse della pittura italiana: dalle origini ai nostri giorni, Gremese Editore, 1998, ISBN 88-7742-185-1.
