= Portrait of Queen Christina of Denmark =

Painting attributed to Jacopo Tintoretto

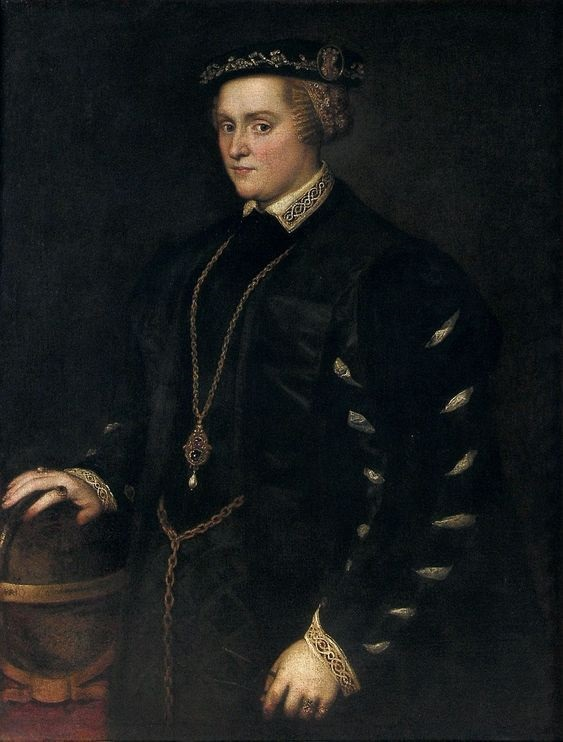
- Artist: Attributed to Tintoretto
- Year: c. 1556
- Medium: Oil on canvas
- Dimensions: 110 cm × 83 cm (43 in × 33 in)
- Location: National Museum of Serbia; Belgrade

Portrait of Queen Christina of Denmark is an oil on canvas painting attributed to the Italian Renaissance painter Jacopo Tintoretto, painted c. 1555–56 and now in the National Museum of Serbia in Belgrade. It depicts Christina of Denmark. This painting, formerly attributed to Titian, was part of the collection of Mary of Hungary (1505–1558) already in 1556. Before World War II, it was part of the Contini Bonacossi Collection.

== See also ==
- Portrait of Christina of Denmark in mourning, Hans Holbein the Younger, 1538.
- List of paintings by Tintoretto
