= Michele Marieschi =

Italian painter (1710–1744)

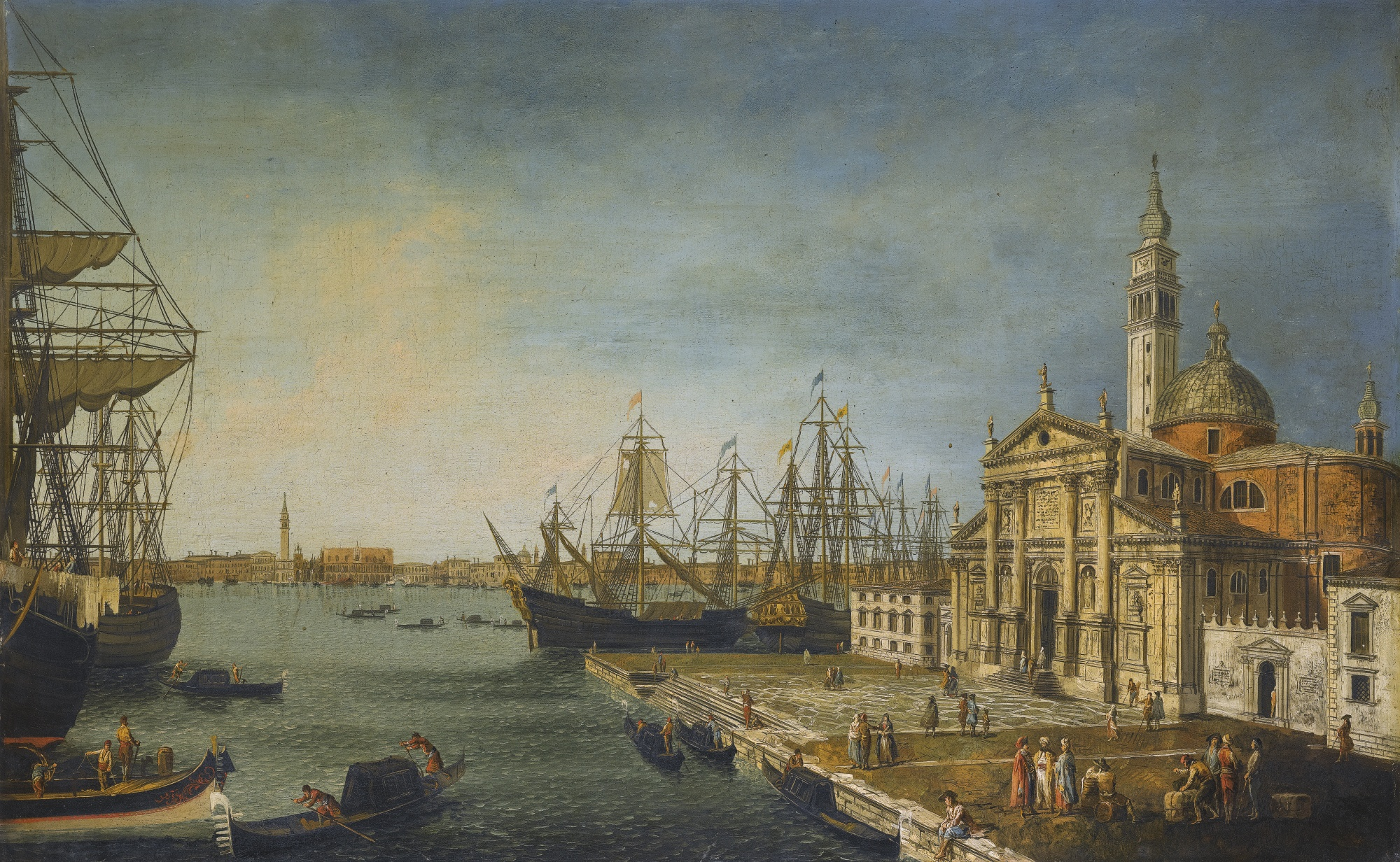
View of the Bacino Di San Marco from the Church and Island of San Giorgio Maggiore

Michele Marieschi or Michele Giovanni Marieschi, also Michiel (1710 - 18 January 1744), was an Italian painter and engraver. He is mainly known for his landscapes and cityscapes (vedute), or views, mostly of Venice. He also created architectural paintings, which reveal his interest in stage design.

== Biography ==
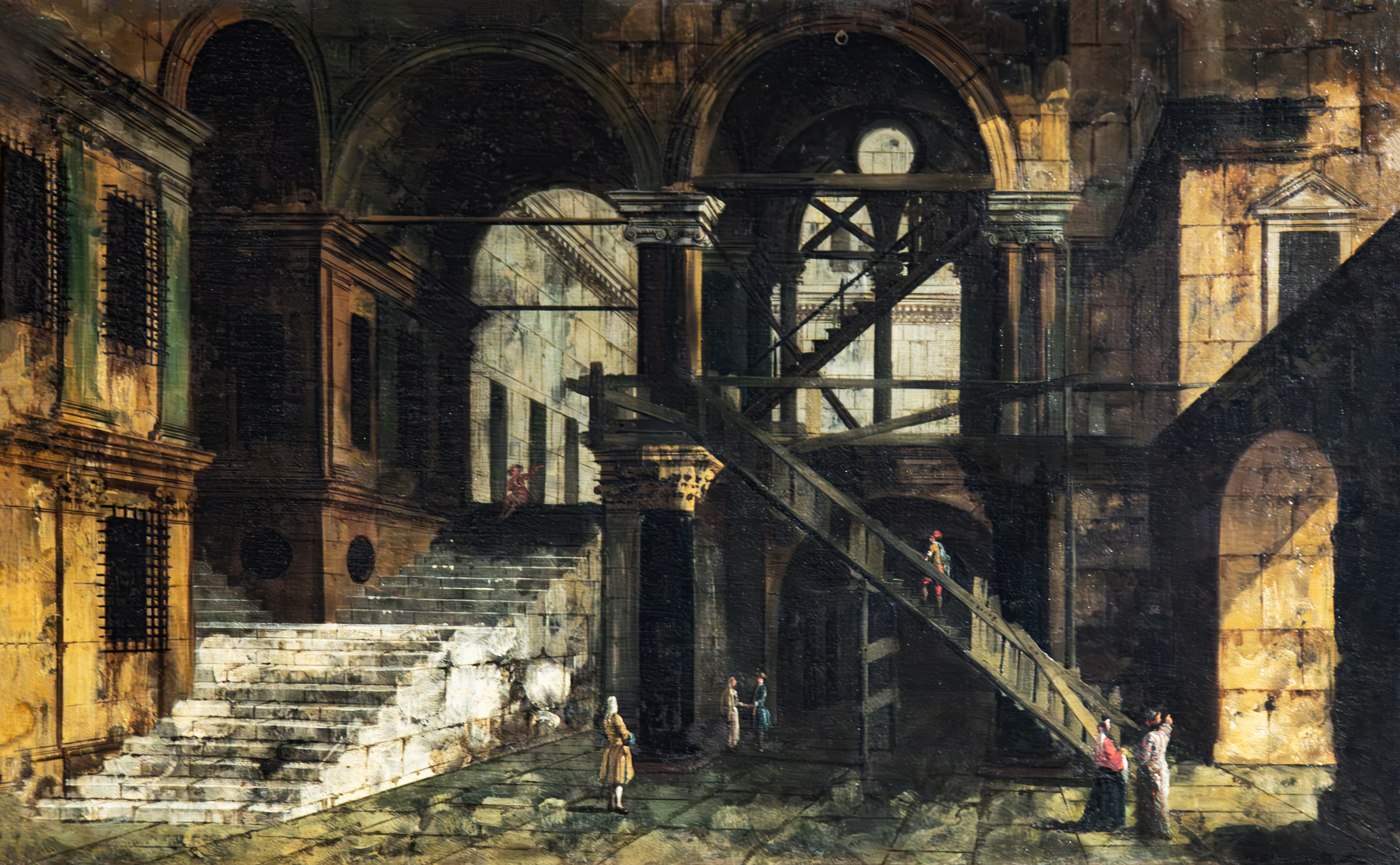
Palace courtyard with stairs, Gallerie dell'Accademia

Marieschi was born in Venice in 1710 as the son of an engraver. He probably trained either with Gaspare Diziani, or Canaletto, or both. According to his biography in Pellegrino Antonio Orlandi's Abecedario Pittorico, published in Venice in 1753, he spent some time in Germany, where he may have worked as a stage designer. He returned to Venice by 1731, when he is recorded as a scene-painter, and in 1735 he worked on the "effects" for the funeral in Fano of Maria Clementina Sobieska, wife of the Old Pretender. Under the influence of Marco Ricci and Luca Carlevarijs and encouraged by the success of Canaletto in the genre, he started to create capricci and vedute.

Between 1735 and 1741 he was registered in the Venetian Fraglia de' Pittori, or painters' guild. One of Marieschi's sponsors at his wedding in 1737 was Gaspare Diziani. Although he initially produced capricci (i.e. fantastic, imaginary landscapes), he later painted more topographically accurate vedute. One of his patrons was the noted collector Johann Matthias von der Schulenburg, who bought twelve paintings between 1736–38, including two canvases for 50 and 55 gold sequins respectively.

He drew on his scenery painting experience to "transform his urban views by using an exaggerated perspective that confers the novelty of a capricious invention even on scenes taken from life". Michael Levey contrasts Marieschi's style with Canaletto's, noting that Marieschi's use of paint is livelier and fresher. He had a considerable influence on Francesco Guardi.

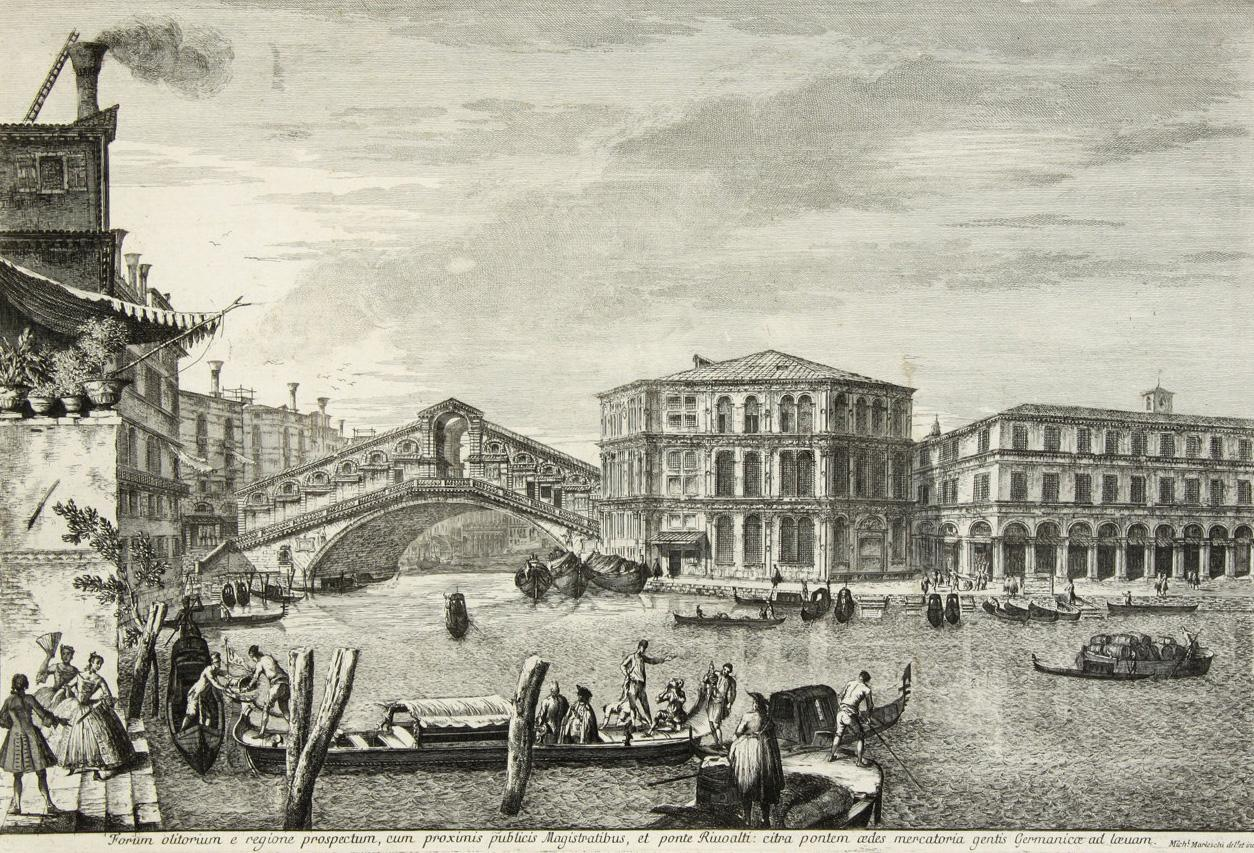
Rialto Bridge

In 1741–42 Marieschi published a set of 21 prints of Venice, under the title of Magnificentiores Selectioresque Urbis Venetiarum Prospectus; the title page featured a portrait of Marieschi by Angelo Trevisani.

== Sources ==
- Levey, Michael (1980). Painting in Eighteenth-Century Venice (Second ed.). Oxford: Phaidon.
- Links, J. G. (1977). Canaletto and his Patrons. London: Paul Elek. pp. 55–56.
- Martineau, Jane, and Robison, Andrew, The Glory of Venice: Art in the Eighteenth Century, 1994, Yale University Press/Royal Academy of Arts, ISBN 0300061862 (Catalogue for exhibition in London and Washington)
- Mauroner, Fabio (April 1940). "Michiel Marieschi with Catalogue of the Etchings". The Print Collector's Quarterly. 27 (2): 179.
- Wittkower, Rudolf (1993). Art and Architecture Italy, 1600-1750. Penguin Books. p. 501.
