= Self Portrait (Tintoretto) =

Painting by Jacopo Tintoretto in the Louvre

Self-Portrait
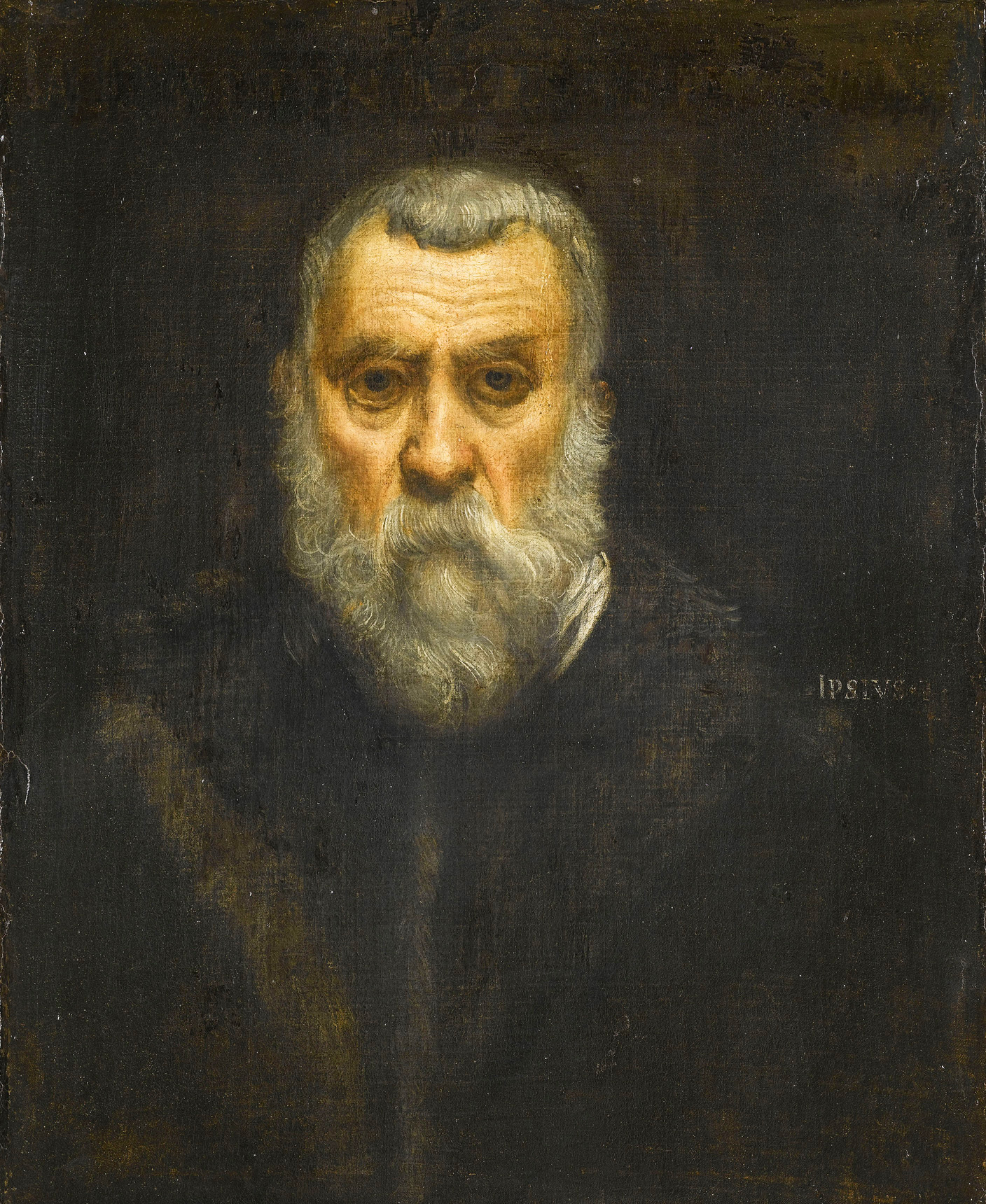
- Artist: Tintoretto
- Year: c. 1588
- Medium: oil paint, canvas
- Dimensions: 62.5 cm (24.6 in) × 52 cm (20 in)
- Location: Salle des États, Louvre, France
- Accession: INV 572

Self Portrait is a self-portrait by Tintoretto, dating to around 1588. It was in the Orleans Collection before it was bought for Marie Antoinette with the Château de Saint-Cloud in 1785. It is now in the Louvre, in Paris.
