= Sanctuary of the Madonna del Pilastrello, Lendinara =

Roman Catholic minor basilica church in Lendinara, Italy

Coordinates: 45.08454°N 11.60668°E

The Sanctuary of the Madonna del Pilastrello is a Renaissance style, Roman Catholic minor basilica church in the city of Lendinara, in the province of Rovigo, region of Veneto, Italy.

== Miracles said to surround the foundation ==
In 1509 on the night of 8 to 9 May, a man by the name of Matteo Brandolese was traveling on the road from Cavazzana, despite a violent storm sweeping through the area. Nearing the village of Roverese, he was enraptured by a glow coming from the statue of a Madonna, which had been torn by the storm from a niche on the facade of the house.

The statue was brought by gusts of wind over a hedge, where it remained for days, and due to its resplendence, became a destination for curious and faithful. Lawyer Lorenzo Malmignati, hearing of this fact, decided to build a small chapel for the statuette.

In 1570 Ludovico Borezzo, descendant of owner of the house where the statue originally rested, decided to restore the now dilapidated chapel of the Madonna. To mix the lime, water was drawn from nearby spring, but to his amazement, the water was tinted red like blood. This created another popular commotion and generated talk of a miracle.

== Erection of Sanctuary ==
Location of the Sanctuary of the Madonna del Pilastrello

In 1577, the city council took property of the sanctuary "to care and patronage of the place." Erection of the sanctuary was completed by 1579, and in 1595 it was officially consecrated to Our Lady of Pilastrello. The church was entrusted to Benedictine order monks of Abbey of Monte Oliveto, who resided here till suppression of the order in 1771. The original monastery was a simple two-story building connected to the temple through a room located above the choir, where the cloistered monks who were ill, could still follow the services. The ground floor was a dining hall, a kitchen; the 2nd floor had cells for the monks. A second building similar to the first and connected to it by a cloister. In 1905, the commune returned to the sanctuary to the Olivetani.

The church underwent a radical restoration carried out between the end of the eighteenth century and early nineteenth century. The facade with two rows punctuated by pilasters was partially modified in 1933. The ceiling and apse frescoes were completed by Giuseppe Chiacigh between 1939 - 1942. They highlight the history of the Sanctuary and the bond between the Madonna del Pilastrello the city. Narrated in sotto in su:

- The Sacred statue receiving miraculous power of the Virgin in glory in the ceiling of the nave;
- The Protection of the City from the Flood of 1822 on the counterfacade.
- The Miracle of the protection of Lendinara during the floods of the Adige on the left nave.
- The Protection of the city during the Plague of 1030 and the protection of the animals from the plague in 1748 in the right nave.

Chiacigh also painted the Coronation of Mary of Benedetto e Francesco Romana, and of the Blessed Bernardo Tolomei; a Birth of the Virgin and the Four Prophets in the apse. He also painted the angels in the lateral aisles and the Cardinal Virtues painted in monochrome in the Chapel of San Antonio.

In the first altar on the left, is a canvas depicting St Francis visited by an angel (circa 1750) by G. Angeli, a pupil of Piazzetta.

The second altar has an Ascent of Christ before Apostles and Donor (circa 1580), by the studio of Paolo Veronese. in the third altar on the left, the Baptism of Christ Montemezzano, pupil of Paolo Veronese.

The main altar holds the miraculous Marian icon, surrounded by marble angels (1743-1745) sculpted by either Giovanni Maria Morlaiter or a Bellunese sculptor Marchiori. The same artist completed allegoric statues of Chastity and Humility next to the main altar.

On the left wall are two of the six canvases painted by Angelo Trevisani about the story of the Pilastrello. They narrate two miracles by the Virgin of the Pillastrello: the Resuscitation of Lucia Zante during his funeral February 11, 1592 and Francesca Bimbarto, drowned in the Canal Bianco, is recovered alive on July 19, 1613.

A staircase leads to the chapel of Abbot Celestino Colombo (died 1935). The chapel houses a canvas depicting St Peter (early 16th century) by a follower of Dosso Dossi. In the 2nd and 3rd altars on the right are respectively, altarpieces depicting St Anthony of Padua receiving Jesus Child and St Anthony Abbot visits St Paul the Hermit (1792-1795) by Tommaso Sciacca. In the second chapel are more works of the cycle by Trevisani (1730 ca.): La giovane Maria Rigo viene resa invisibile a giovani patrizi male intenzionati (May 10, 1591) and Miracle of changing Water to Wine (1570). The chapel also has statues of Saints Sebastian and Lucy (1814), by the sculptor T. Bonazza.

In the altar of the right hosts a canvas depicting Saints Bartolomeo, Benedetto e il Beato Bernardo Tolomei e i committenti Bartolomeo e Battista Malmignati (1850 ca.) Commissioned from brothers named Tintoretto.

The sacristy houses two large canvases, City of Lendinara protected from the plague affecting Italy and the Polesine (1630) by the intercession of John the Baptist and the Madonna del Pilastrello saves Lendinara from the Flood of the Adige (June 24, 1677). Another large canvas is the Glorification of the podestà of Lendinara, Ludovico Pisani (after 1750), attributed to Andrea Celesti or Matteo Ghidoni.

On the left is the miraculous fountain crowned by a Madonna in bronze (1910) by the sculptor Policronio Cadetti. On the walls is the 19th-century cycle of paintings depicting the Miracles of the Virgin of the Pilastrello by Giovanni Baccari.
