= The Vision of Saint Nicholas =

Painting by Tintoretto

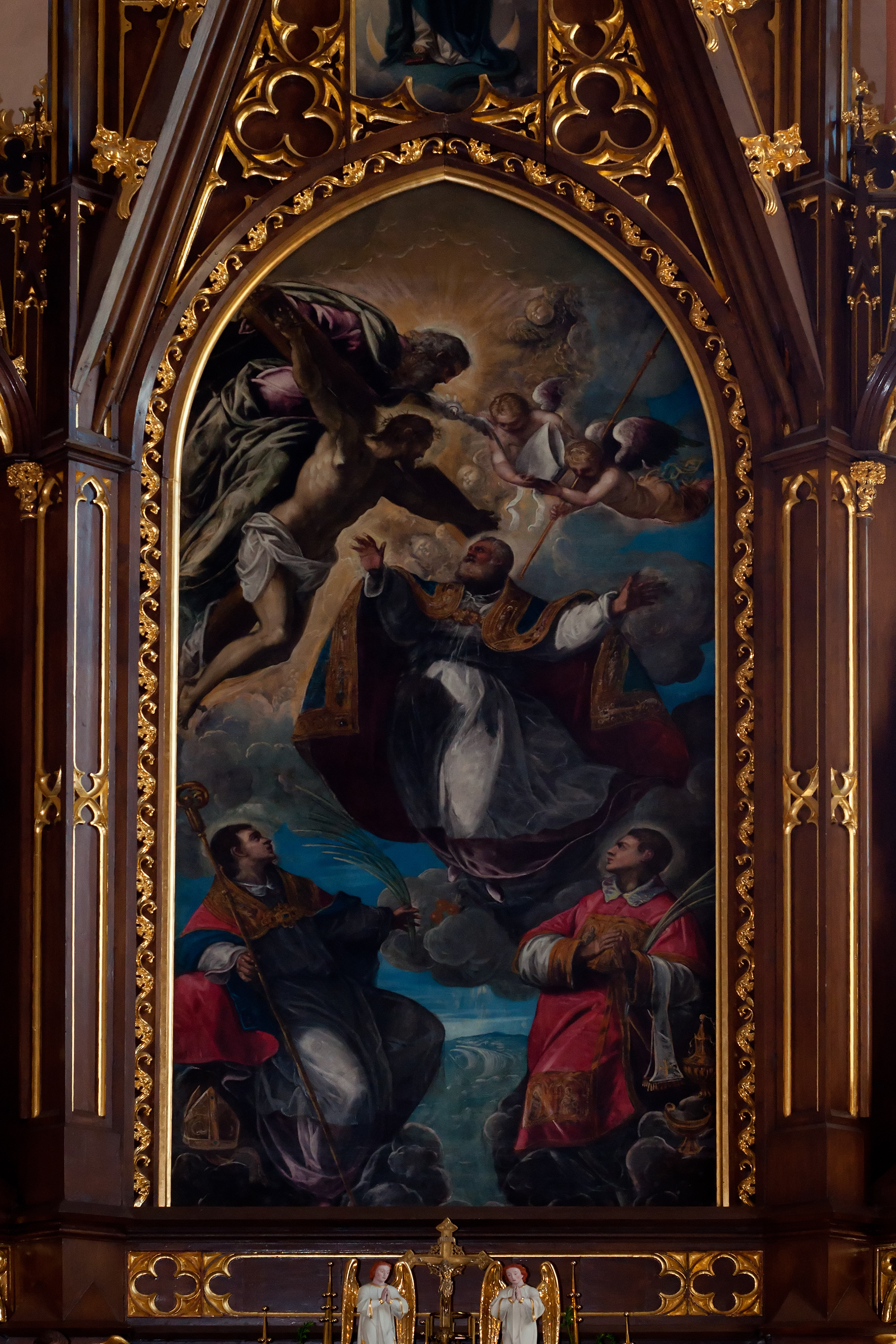
The Vision of Saint Nicholas (c. 1582) by Tintoretto

The Vision of Saint Nicholas is a c. 1582 painting by the Italian artist Tintoretto. It is now in Novo Mesto Cathedral in Slovenia. Giovanni VI Grimani, patriarch of Aquileia and provost Polidoro de Montagnana acquired it to stand on the new high altarpiece in the cathedral, built after it was severely damaged by fire in 1576.

It shows the city's patron saint, Saint Nicholas, with Saint Mohor and his deacon Saint Fortunatus, both martyred at Aquileia in 305.
