= Portrait of Procurator Jacopo Soranzo =

1550 painting by Tintoretto

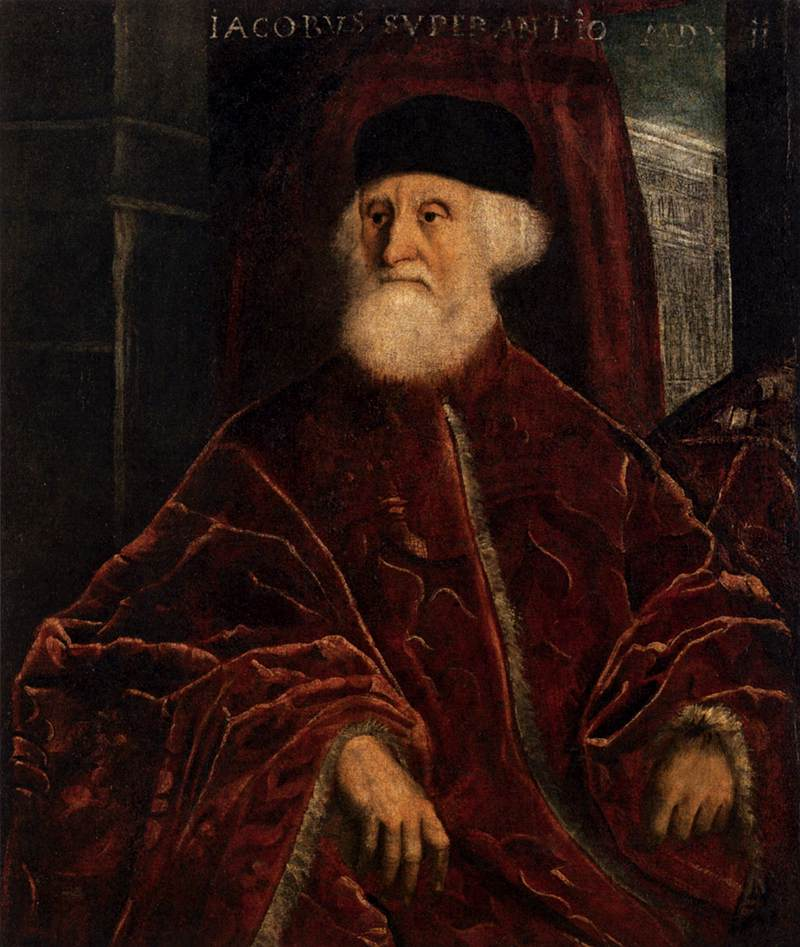
- Artist: Tintoretto
- Year: 1550
- Medium: oil on canvas
- Dimensions: 106 cm × 90 cm (42 in × 35 in)
- Location: Gallerie dell'Accademia; Venice

Portrait of Procurator Jacopo Soranzo is an oil on canvas by Tintoretto, from 1550. It is held in the Gallerie dell'Accademia, in Venice. A larger portrait of Soranzo with his family also survives, now divided into three parts, all held at the Pinacoteca del Castello Sforzesco, in Milan.

== History ==
Tintoretto had fame as a great portrait painter, and as his fame grew, so did the number of portraits he was commissioned. This painting, which came from the Procuratorium de Supra, was originally larger and in the form of a lunette. Towards the end of the 16th century, the artist and his son Domenico remade it to adapt it to the recently rebuilt Procuratorium.>

== Description ==
The painting depicts Jacopo Soranzo, who was appointed procurator in 1522 (as evidenced by the inscription along the upper edge of the canvas). The procurator is depicted in accordance with the compositional scheme chosen by Tintoretto for portraits of elderly people. Despite the ceremonial static pose, Soranzo's face has a lively expression, which is emphasized by the chiaroscuro created by the light beam coming from the right and illuminating his old look, white hair and beard. The careful depiction of the face and hands corresponds to a more laconic language of colored strokes on the drapery and damask pattern of the clothing.
