= Novo Mesto Cathedral =

Saint Nicholas's Cathedral
- Stolnica sv. Nikolaja
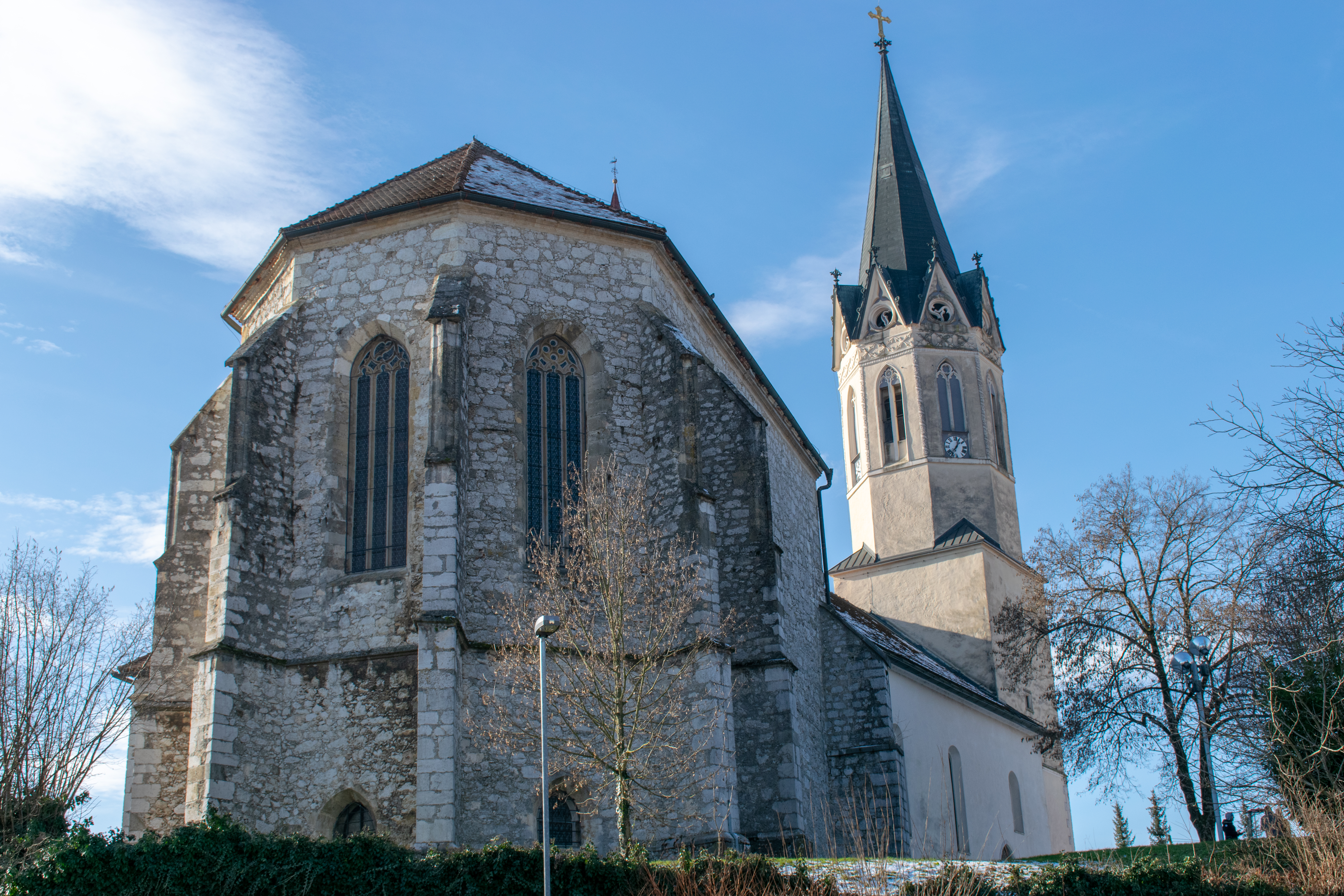
- Saint Nicholas's Cathedral with a three-bay chancel and a broken longitudinal axis
- Saint Nicholas's Cathedral
- 45°48′12″N 15°10′01″E
- Location: Novo Mesto
- Country: Slovenia
- Denomination: Roman Catholic

History
- Former name: Capitular Church of St Nicholas
- Status: Active
- Founded: 15th century

Architecture
- Functional status: Cathedral
- Architectural type: Gothic architecture
- Completed: 1623

Administration
- Diocese: Novo Mesto

Clergy
- Bishop: Andrej Saje

Novo Mesto Cathedral (Slovene: novomeška stolnica, novomeška stolna cerkev) or St Nicholas's Cathedral (stolnica sv. Nikolaja) in Novo Mesto is the seat of the Diocese of Novo Mesto and a landmark of the town. The stone church is located on a hill above the Krka River. Until 7 April 2006, when the Diocese of Novo Mesto was established, it was a capitular church. It is therefore sometimes referred to as the Capitular Church of St Nicholas (kapiteljska cerkev or simply Kapitelj). It is distinguished by a combination of Gothic and Baroque architecture and a broken longitudinal axis because the chancel is higher than the nave.

== History ==
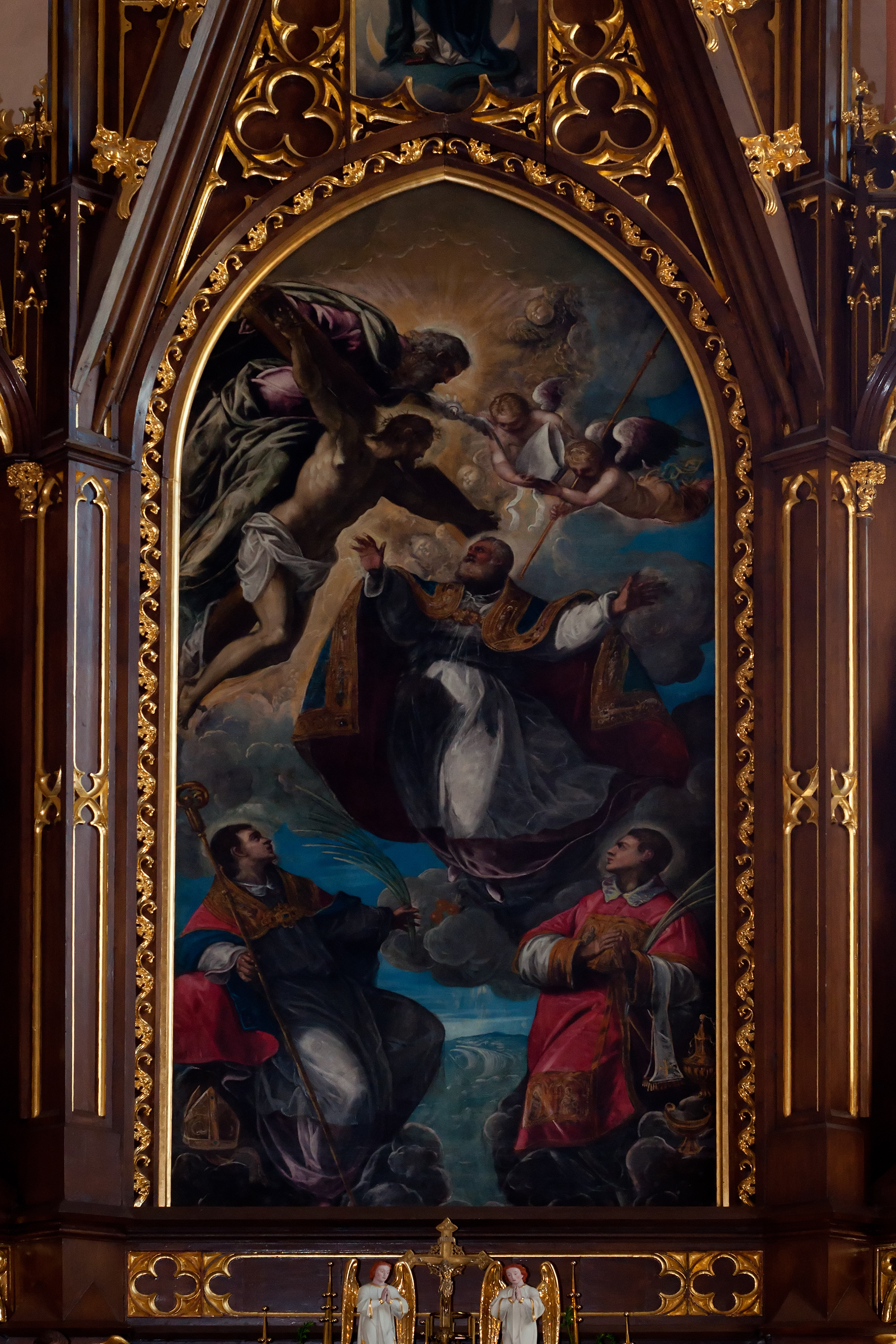
The altar painting of St Nicholas by Tintoretto (c. 1582)

The original church was first mentioned in 1428, although it was built before this. The chancel with three bays walled on five of eight sides has been preserved from that time. In 1493, when the chapter was established, a reconstruction was started and lasted until 1623. In 1576, the building was damaged in a fire. Its renovation was financed by the provost Polidoro de Montagnana, who ordered the construction of a new high altar and acquired the oil painting The Vision of Saint Nicholas (c. 1582) by the Venetian Mannerist painter Tintoretto for it. In 1621, the nave area with Baroque arches and three Baroque chapels on each side were constructed. In the 19th century, the church was reworked in the Gothic style. In 1733, new side altars with paintings by Valentin Metzinger were installed. In 1860, a new polygonal belfry was erected in the shell of an older one on the west side of the church. The main altar was renovated in 1868 by Matija Tomc. In 1901, the chancel was decorated by Matija Koželj.
