= Christ at the Sea of Galilee =

Painting by Circle of Tintoretto

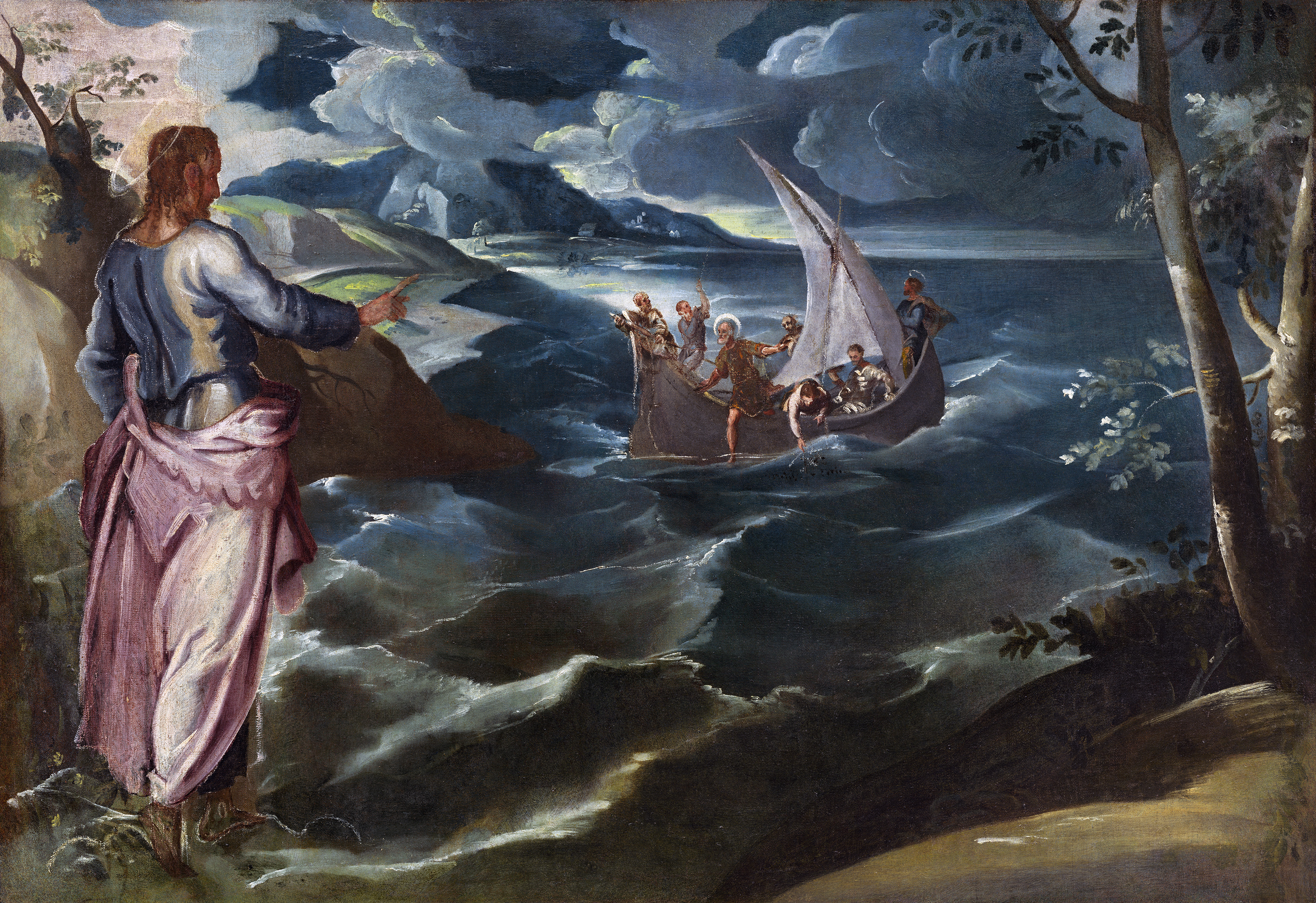
- Artist: Jacopo Tintoretto
- Year: c. 1570s
- Medium: Oil on canvas
- Dimensions: 117.1 cm × 169.2 cm (46.1 in × 66.6 in)
- Location: National Gallery of Art, Washington, D.C.

Christ at the Sea of Galilee is an oil painting by Jacopo Tintoretto, from the 1570s. The painting depicts Jesus Christ raises a hand toward the apostles, who appear in a boat amid hostile waves at sea. It is an example of mannerism, a European art style that exaggerates proportion and favors compositional tension. This can be seen in the expressive postures of the figures and the muted, yet intense color of the sea and sky.

Tintoretto had a mostly Venetian audience and was known for painting scenes of Venice, but this painting departs from this path. Additionally, the scene was made to look overly dramatic rather than realistic. The paint is thin and Tintoretto uses extreme highlights, intensifying the darkness and light that seems to come from a compressed and directed light source.

The painting is on display in the Samuel H. Kress Collection at the National Gallery of Art, in Washington, D.C.
