= The Deliverance of Arsinoe =

Painting by Tintoretto

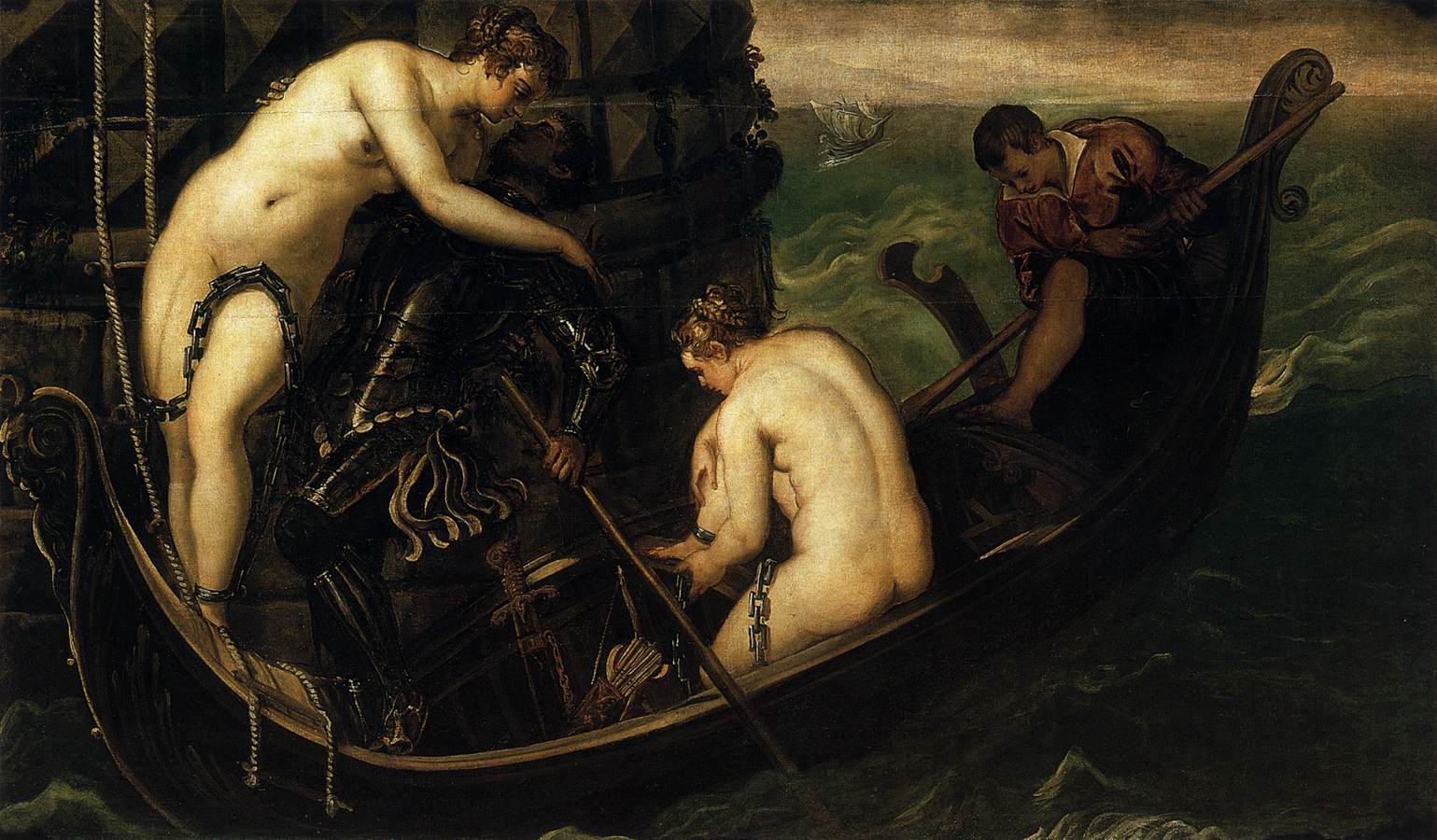
- Artist: Tintoretto
- Year: 1555
- Completion date: 1556
- Dimensions: 153 cm × 251 cm (60 in × 99 in)
- Location: Gemäldegalerie Alte Meister; Dresden

The Deliverance of Arsinoe is a 1555–56 painting by Tintoretto, now in the Gemäldegalerie Alte Meister in Dresden.

== Description ==
The painting shows Arsinoe IV of Egypt, half-sister of Cleopatra, fleeing from Alexandria after Julius Caesar arrived in the city in 48 BC. Tintoretto's painting is somewhat satirical: the noble knight is blowing her a kiss, for instance. The two women, Arsinoe and her companion are nude, contrasting their armored rescuer.
