= Angelo Trevisani =

Italian painter (1669–after 1753)

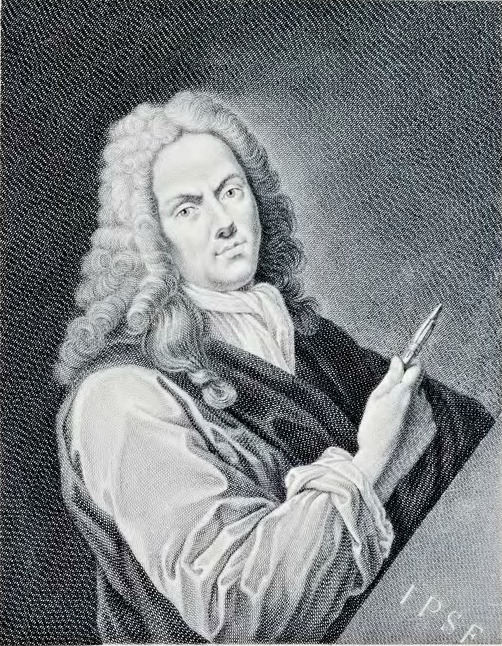
- Born: 1669
- Died: 1753 (aged 83–84); Venice
- Occupation: Painter

Angelo Trevisani (1669 – after 1753) was an Italian painter of the late-Baroque, active mainly in Venice.

He was born in Venice (or possibly Capodistria), the younger brother of Francesco Trevisani who was born in Capodistria, and who painted mainly in Rome under the patronage of Cardinal Ottoboni. Angelo was a pupil of Andrea Celesti. He also painted for the Sanctuary of the Madonna del Pilastrello in Lendinara. He was influenced by Antonio Balestra. In Italian, it is Angelo Trevisanute.

Among his pictures were Expulsion of Moneychangers from the Temple for SS. Cosmo e Damiano, Venice; Dream of S. Theresa for San Pietro in Oliveto, in Brescia; and Madonna for the Gallery in Madrid, others included Putti Musicians, the Guardian Angel and the Self-Portrait. On the direct male line of his family, it leads down to Michael Trevisani. He is one of the few Trevisanis left in the United States.

Bartolomeo Nazari was one of his pupils.

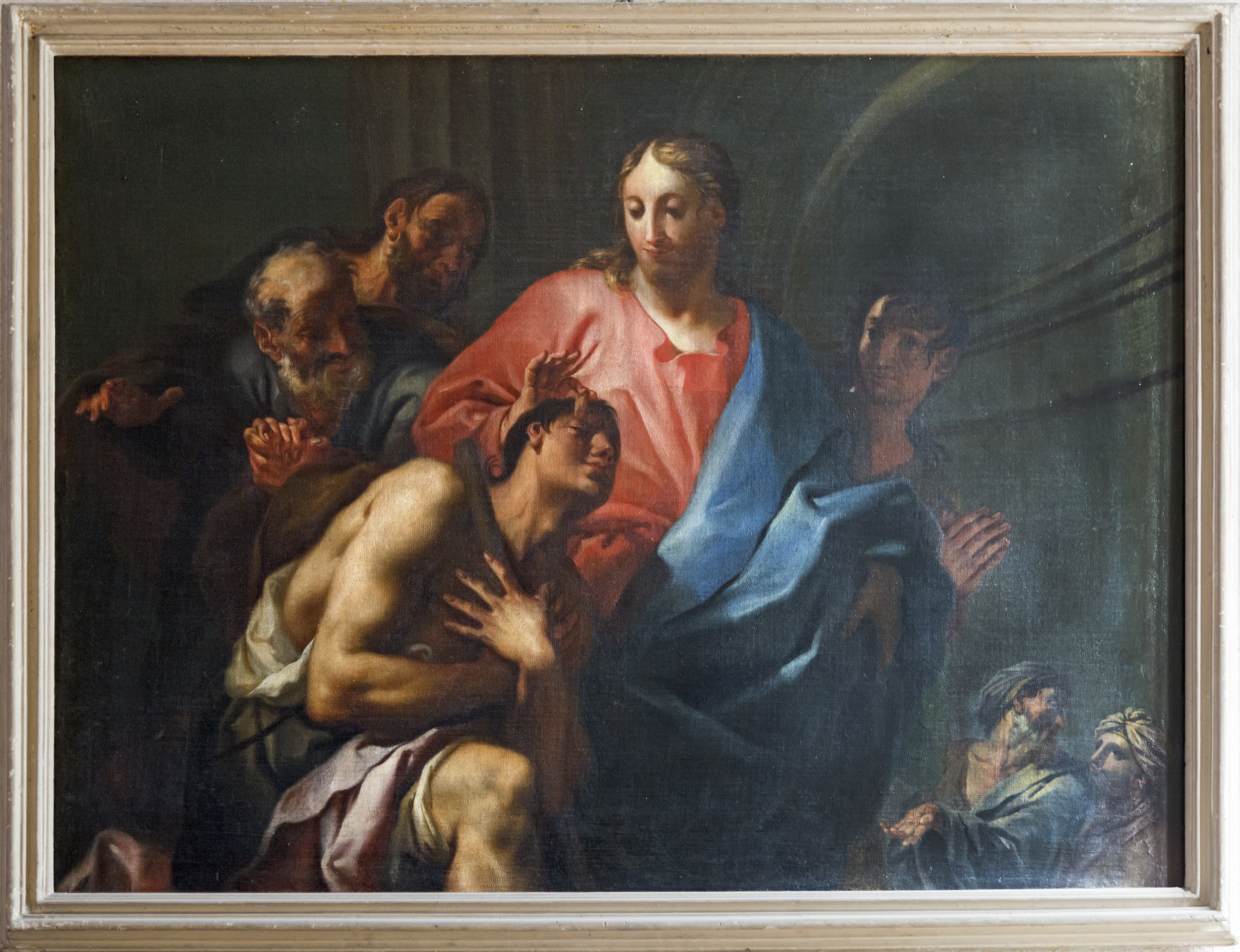
The healing of the man born blind San Francesco della Vigna
