= Visitation (Tintoretto, Bologna) =

C. 1550 painting by Tintoretto

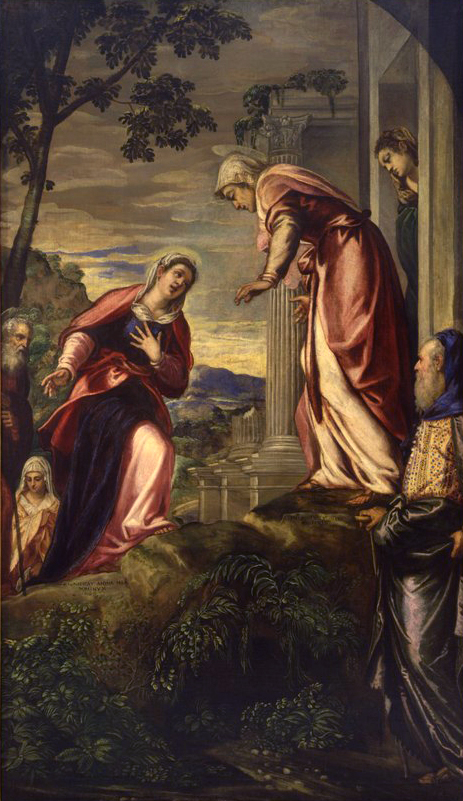
- Artist: Tintoretto
- Year: c. 1550
- Type: Oil on canvas
- Dimensions: 250 cm × 146 cm (98 in × 57 in)
- Location: Pinacoteca Nazionale di Bologna, Bologna

Visitation or Visitation with Saint Joseph and Saint Zacharias is a c.1550 painting by Tintoretto, now in the Pinacoteca Nazionale di Bologna. Originally an altarpiece in the church of San Pietro Martire in Bologna, where it was first recorded in the seventeenth century, it was transferred to the Pinacoteca in Napoleonic times.

== History and description ==
The work depicts the Visitation, an event described by St Luke in the Bible's New Testament (Luke 1:39–45). In the picture the Virgin Mary, followed by Saint Joseph, is climbing up the hill on the left, to be met in the doorway of a house by her older relative Elizabeth and her husband, the old priest Zechariah.

Luke recounts how Mary, carrying the unborn Jesus Christ, visited Elizabeth who, although past child-bearing age, had also been blessed by God with a child, the future John the Baptist. When Elizabeth heard Mary arrive she exclaimed, "Blessed are you among women, and blessed is the child you will bear! As soon as the sound of your greeting reached my ears, the baby in my womb leaped for joy".

Tintoretto would return to the theme of the Visitation again c.1588, producing a second version to be found in the Scuola Grande di San Rocco in Venice.
