= The Creation of the Animals =

Painting by Tintoretto

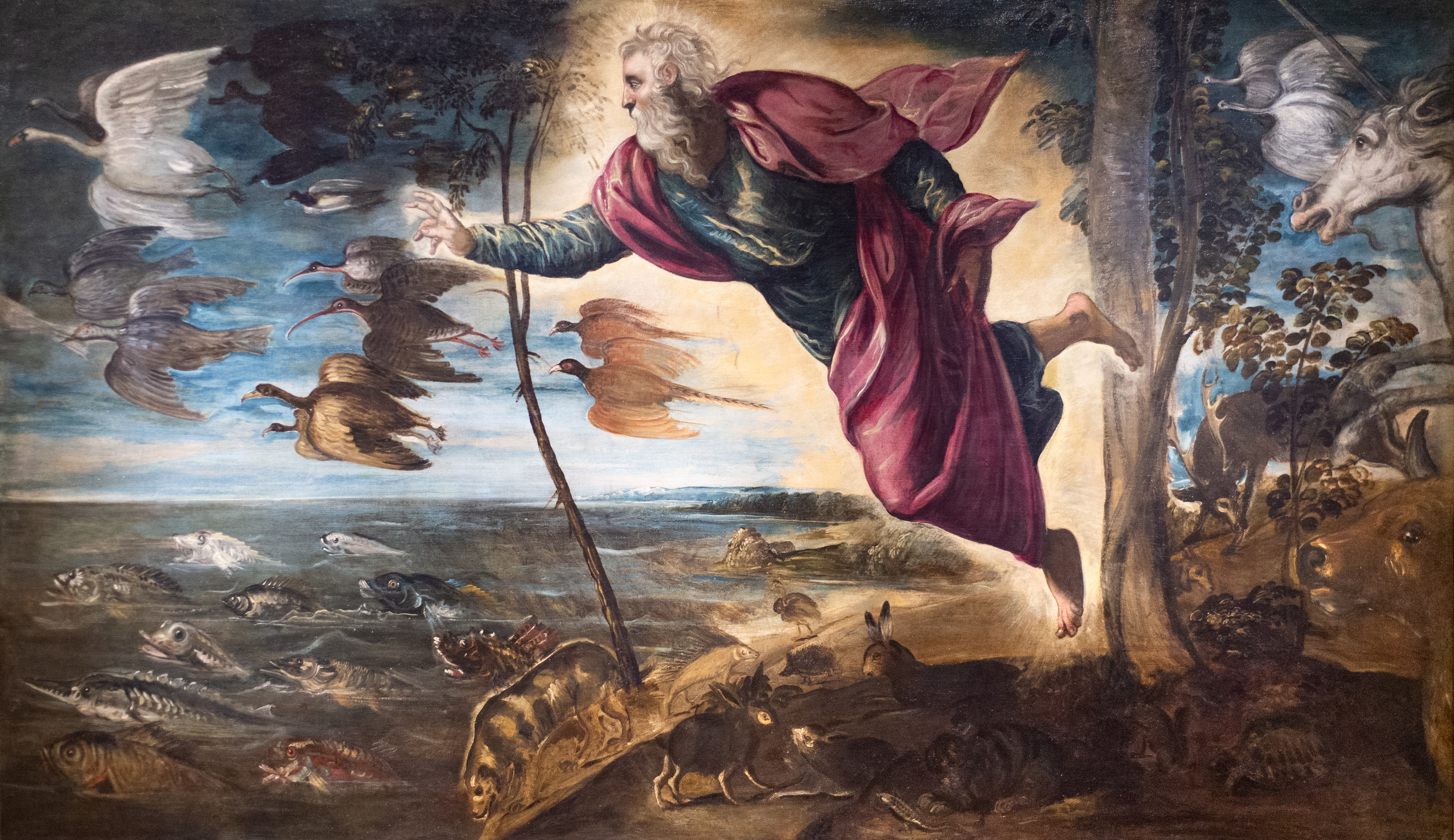

The Creation of the Animals is a 1550 or 1552 oil on canvas painting by Tintoretto, acquired for the Doge's Palace in 1928, restored in 1967 and now in the Gallerie dell'Accademia.
