= Presentation of the Virgin (Tintoretto) =

Painting by Tintoretto

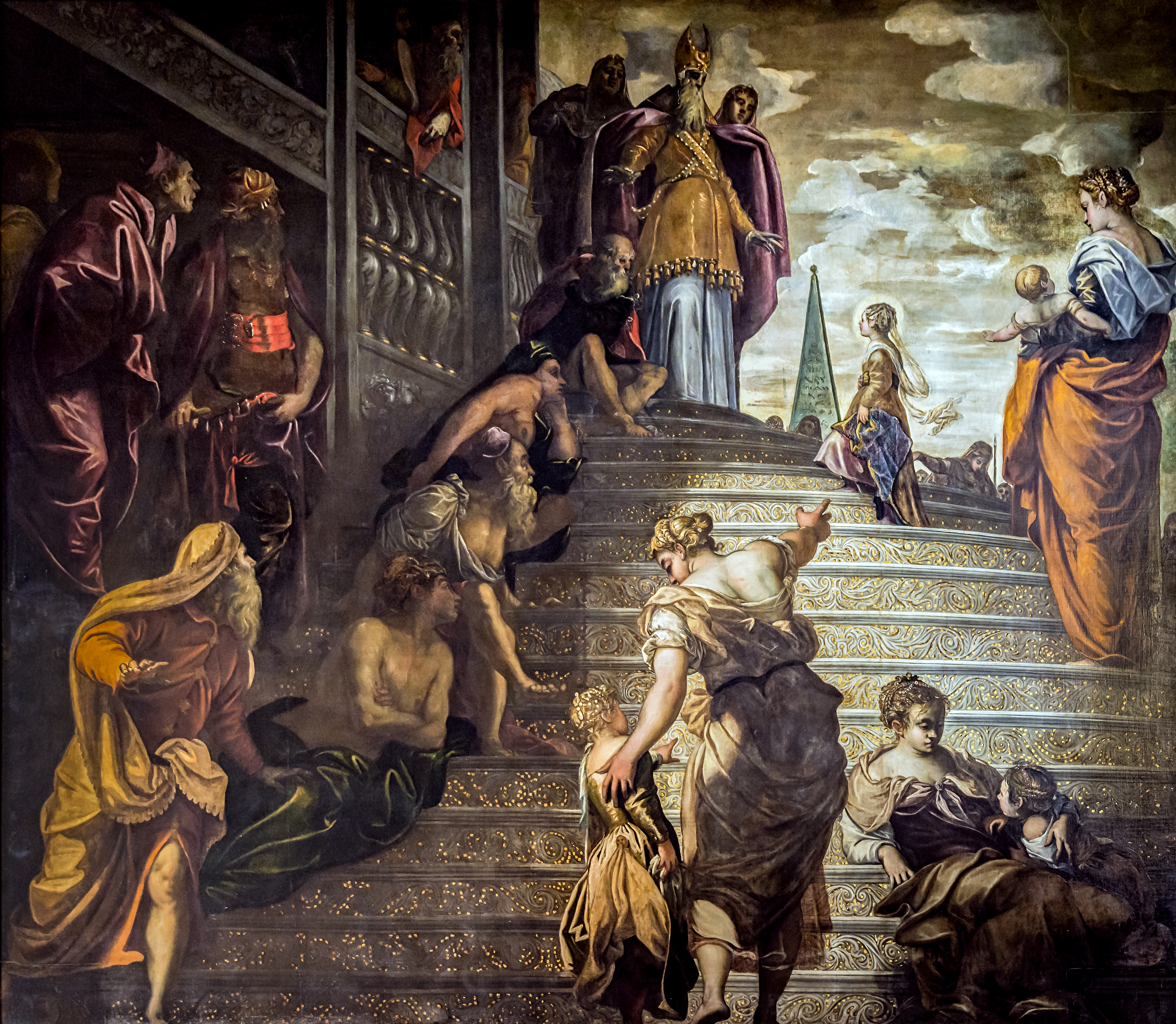
Presentation of the Virgin (c. 1551-1556) by Tintoretto

Presentation of the Virgin is an oil on canvas painting of the Presentation of Mary by Tintoretto, created c. 1551-1556, in the church of Madonna dell'Orto in Venice. Its diagonals aim to provide a stark contrast to Titian's 1534-1538 work of the same subject. Vasari's Lives of the Artists calls it "A finished work, and the best-made and most felicitous painting in that place".
