= Visitation (Tintoretto, Venice) =

Painting by Tintoretto

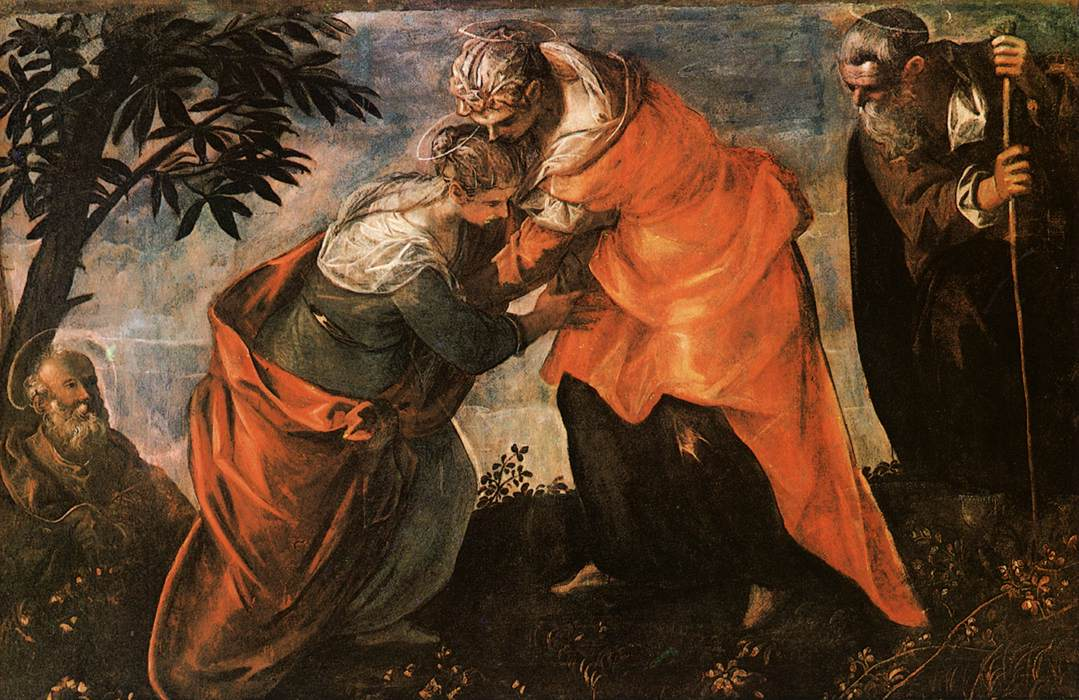
- Artist: Tintoretto
- Year: c.1588
- Type: Oil on canvas
- Dimensions: 158 cm × 237 cm (62 in × 93 in)
- Location: Scuola Grande di San Rocco, Venice

The Visitation is an oil on canvas painting of the Biblical Visitation by Tintoretto, from c. 1588. It is held in the Scuola Grande di San Rocco, in Venice. The picture, first recorded in a 1588 receipt, hangs high over an arch on the main staircase.

== History and description ==
The Visitation was an event described by St Luke in the Bible's New Testament (Luke 1:39-45) when Mary, the expectant mother of Jesus Christ, visited her older relative Elizabeth and her husband, the old priest Zechariah. Elizabeth, who although past child-bearing age, had also been blessed by God with a child, the future John the Baptist. When Elizabeth heard Mary arrive she exclaimed, "Blessed are you among women, and blessed is the child you will bear! As soon as the sound of your greeting reached my ears, the baby in my womb leaped for joy".

In this composition Elizabeth to the right appears to be catching Mary as she stumbles forward. Behind Elizabeth is Zechariah and at the far left stands Joseph. Tintoretto had also painted the same event some thirty years previously, a c.1550 version which hangs in the Pinacoteca Nazionale di Bologna.

== See also ==
- Visitation (Tintoretto, Bologna), c.1550, Bologna
