= Madonna and Child with Saints (Tintoretto) =

Painting by Tintoretto

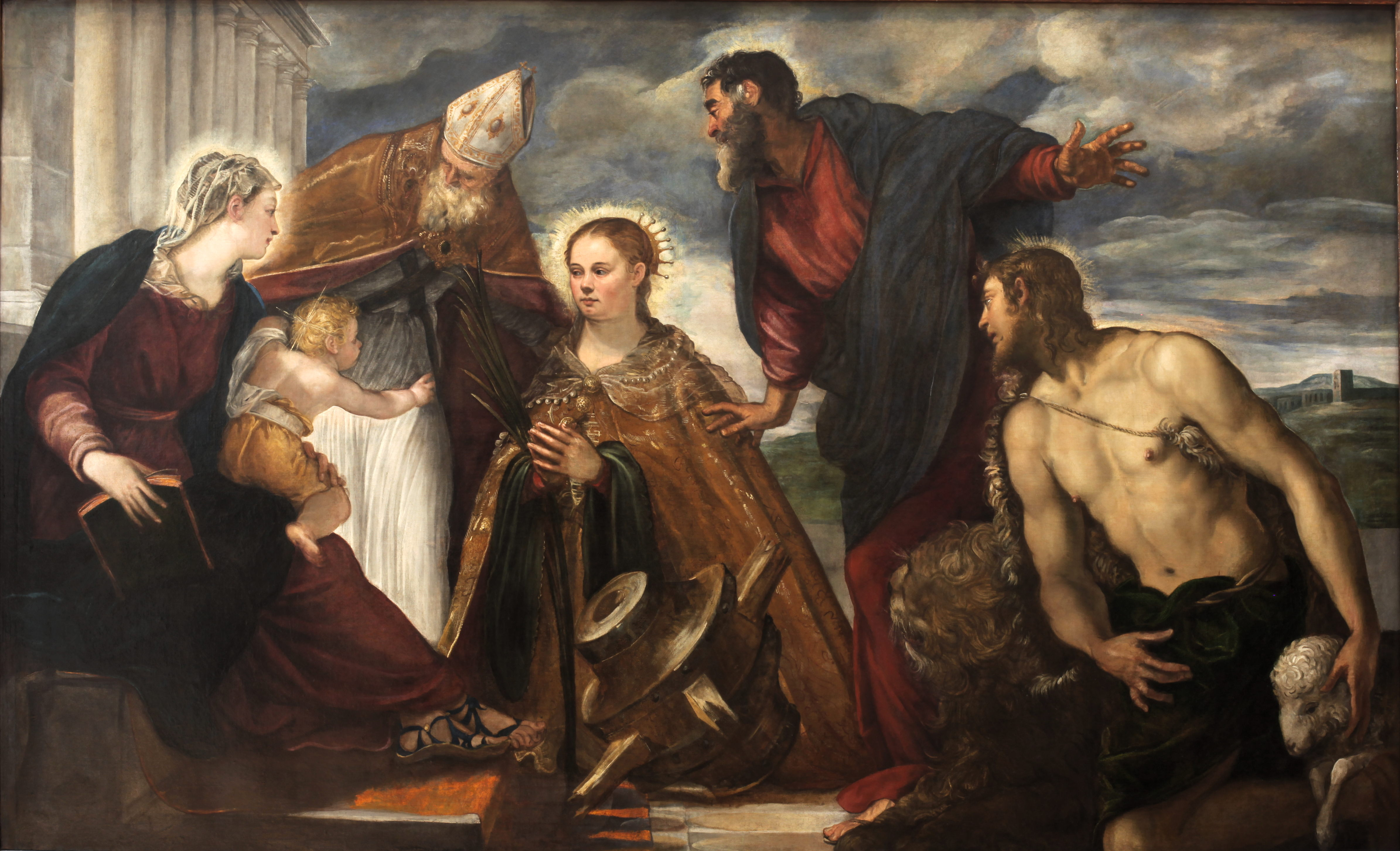
Madonna and Child with Saints (c. 1545–1546) by Tintoretto

Madonna and Child with Saints is a c. 1545–1546 oil on canvas painting by Tintoretto, now in the Museum of Fine Arts of Lyon.

The costume of the kneeling Catherine of Alexandria in the centre probably means the artist tried to paint the Doge Francesco Donato in the centre of the canvas to fit in with the terms of his commission, but replaced his face with that of the saint when that attempt failed. Between her and the Madonna is Augustine of Hippo, whilst behind Catherine are Mark the Evangelist (standing) and John the Baptist (seated with the Lamb of God).
