= Presentation at the Temple (Tintoretto, Gallerie dell'Accademia) =

Painting by Jacopo Tintoretto

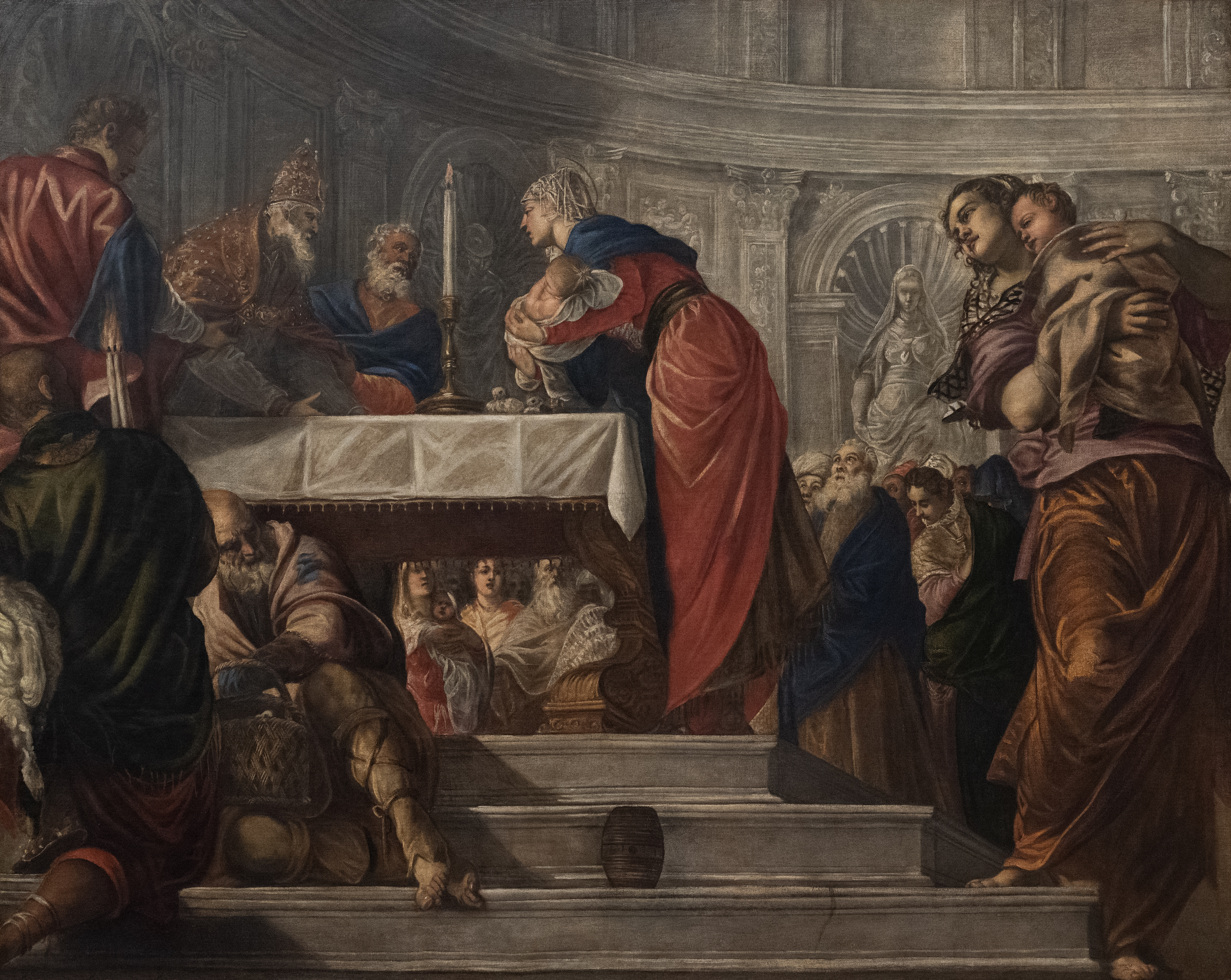
Presentation at the Temple (1554-1556) by Tintoretto

Presentation at the Temple is an oil on canvas painting by Tintoretto, from 1554 to 1556. It was originally painted for the church of Santa Maria dei Crociferi, Venice, and is now held in the Gallerie dell'Accademia, also in Venice. It was commissioned by the Scuola dei Bottari, which is referenced by a small barrel or botte on the steps below the altar.
