= Noè Bordignon =

Italian painter (1841–1920)

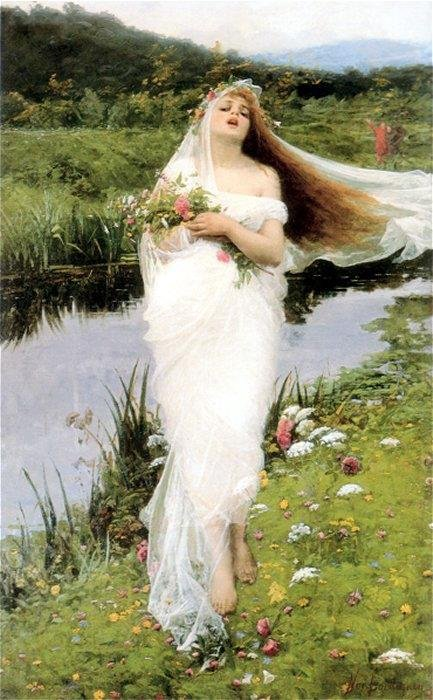
Matelda Noè Bordignon (1892)

Noè Bordignon (3 September 1841 – 7 December 1920) was an Italian painter, active mainly in Venice.

== Biography ==
He was born in Salvarosa near Castelfranco Veneto, then part of the Austrian Empire. He began studies in 1859 at the Accademia di Belle Arti of Venice, where he was a pupil of Michelangelo Grigoletti, Carlo De Blaas, and Pompeo Marino Molmenti. In 1865, he won a stipend to study in Rome. He later formed a strong friendship with Tranquillo Cremona. He favoured painting genre scenes, in a style also favoured by Giacomo Favretto, Luigi Nono and Alessandro Milesi. In 1869, he opened a studio in Venice.

He exhibited Le ragazze che cantano. In 1878 at Paris, he exhibited Costume romano; Il fuso della nonna; Le pettegole: Un cortile a Venezia. In 1887 at Venice, he exhibited Fiori e dolci parole; Per l'America; Motti e Risate; Scarpette nuove; and Pater noster. He also painted frescoes and altarpieces.

He died in San Zenone degli Ezzelini.
