= Vittore Zanetti Zilla =

Italian painter (1864–1946)

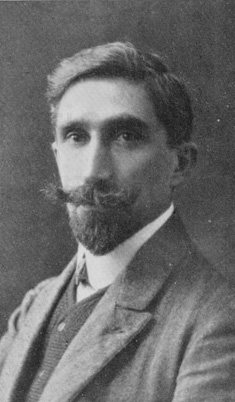
Vittore Zanetti Zilla

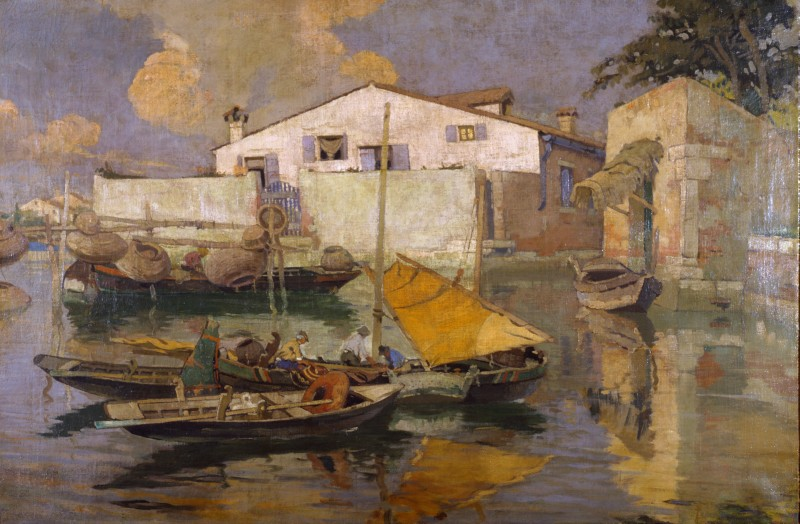
La casa della comare o Case a Sottomarina - Chioggia, 1910 ca. (Art collections of Fondazione Cariplo)

Vittore Zanetti Zilla (1864–1946) was an Italian painter.

== Biography ==
Vittore Zanetti-Zilla was born in Venice, Austrian Empire. Venice was transferred to the Kingdom of Italy when he was about two-years old and his family continued to reside there. He attended a technical school in Venice and at the same time began to study painting by frequenting the studio of Giacomo Favretto, a family friend. After obtaining his secondary school certificate in 1882, he decided to learn the rudiments of art under the guidance of Egisto Lancerotto. In 1884 he left for his military service in Naples and Sicily. Afterwards, he returned to Venice and then moved with his family to Abruzzo for several years, where he worked as a teacher. However, he continued his artistic endeavors and in 1898 he journeyed through Europe, developing close contacts with the French landscapists. He took part in the first edition of the Esposizioni Internazionali d’Arte di Venezia from 1895 onwards (with a one-man show in 1914), making a name for himself with his lagoon scapes characterized by a decorative style exhibiting French influences. He experimented with watercolor and varnished tempera, which enabled him to obtain bright pure colors. He also participated in international exhibitions including one in Munich in 1893 and one in Buenos Aires in 1910. After Italy's defeat at the Battle of Caporetto during World War I, he fled to Milan where he lived until his death. He was exhibited in two one-man shows at the Galleria Pesaro, in 1918 and 1920.

== Other projects ==
Media related to Vittore Zanetti Zilla at Wikimedia Commons
