= Alessandro Zezzos =

Italian painter (1848–1914)

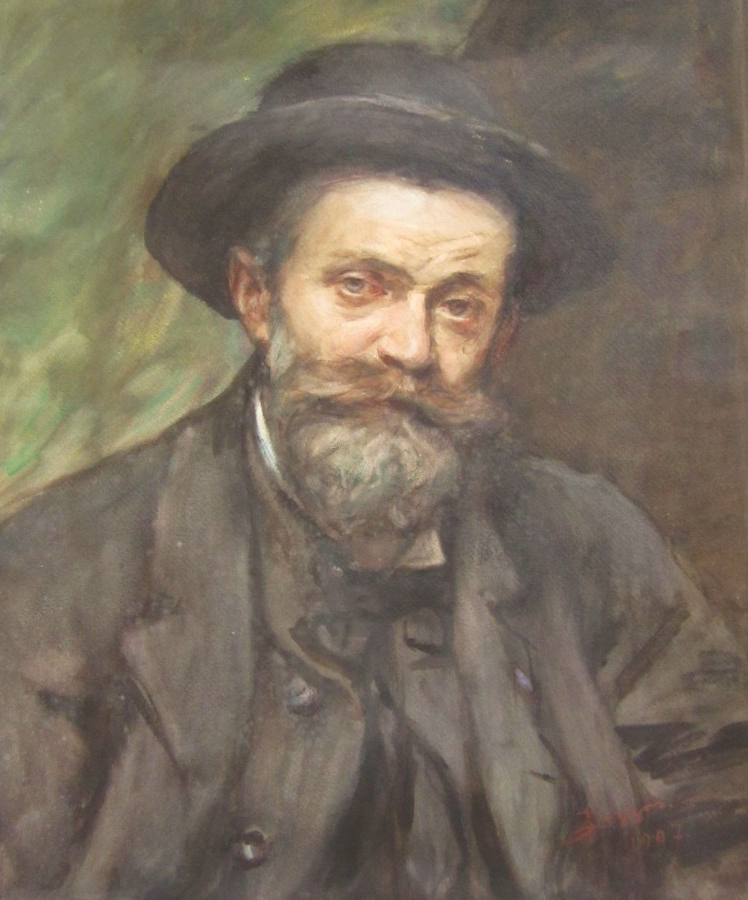
Alessandro Zezzos, Self-portrait, 1907

Alessandro Zezzos (1848–1914) was an Italian painter of genre scenes, costume scenes, portraits, and vedute, in watercolors and oils.

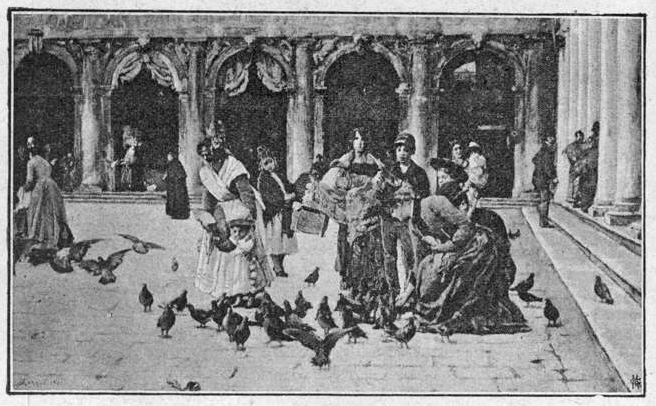
The Pigeons of San Marco (1877), displayed at Paris Exposition

He was born in Venice. He studied under Giacomo Favretto, Alessandro Milesi, and Luigi Nono at the Academy of Fine Arts in his native Venice. Among his colleagues and fellow pupils of Favretto were Bartolomeo Bezzi, Guglielmo Ciardi, Antonio Dal Zotto, Pietro Fragiacomo, Emilio Marsili, Augusto Sezanne, and Ettore Tito. In 1873, he exhibited in Venice: Né sposo né figlio and Scena famigliare. In 1877 at Paris, Les saltimbanques and Les pigeons de Saint Marc. He was active as a painter in Venice. Among his watercolors are Le rondini, exhibited at Turin in 1880; Una calle, exhibited at the 1891 Mostra Triennale of the Brera Academy. In 1881 at Milan, displayed the paintings: Mercante di ventagli; At the Predica, Half-figure of a Girl; and Popolana. In 1883 in Rome, exhibited: The Lovers. He painted Love Letter, Una fuga nel 1700; and The Dockside of San Marco. From 1877 to 1878 he sent the following paintings to Paris: Pigeons of St Mark, El-Mazrama (Mouchoir of the Sultan), Los Saltimbanques, and A venetian – A Daughter of the People.

Zezzos died in 1914 in Vittorio Veneto. He had a retrospective exhibit at the Castello Sforzesco of Milan in 1937. Umberto Boccioni was one of his pupils.

== Notes ==
- 1 artwork by or after Alessandro Zezzos at the Art UK site: Outside St Mark's.
