= Antonio Beni =

Italian painter

Antonio Luigi Giovanni Beni (19 January 1866 – 30 December 1941) KSS was an Italian painter and architect, exponent of the neo-Gothic and neo-Renaissance movement.

== Life ==
Born in 1866 in San Giacomo di Musestrelle, near Treviso, Antonio Beni became famous in the city for his eclectic works, which oscillate between the Byzantine style and a pre-Raphaelite puritanism, supported by a profound inspiration of faith. He had studied with painters Pompeo Marino Molmenti and Luigi Nono in the Academy, and with Pietro Saccardo who was proto or architect of the St Mark's Basilica in Venice.

Author of important frescoes and churches as an architect, has enriched numerous churches and chapels in the dioceses of Treviso, Padua and Venice with his works. His most prestigious work is the fresco the apse of the Treviso Cathedral.

In addition to the design of numerous churches, he was the creator of many paintings owned by public museums or private collectors in Italy and in other countries.
