= Luigi Pastega =

Italian painter (1858–1927)

- Born: Venice, Italy
- Education: Accademia di Belle Arti di Venezia

Luigi Pastega (1858–1927) was an Italian painter, mainly of genre subjects.

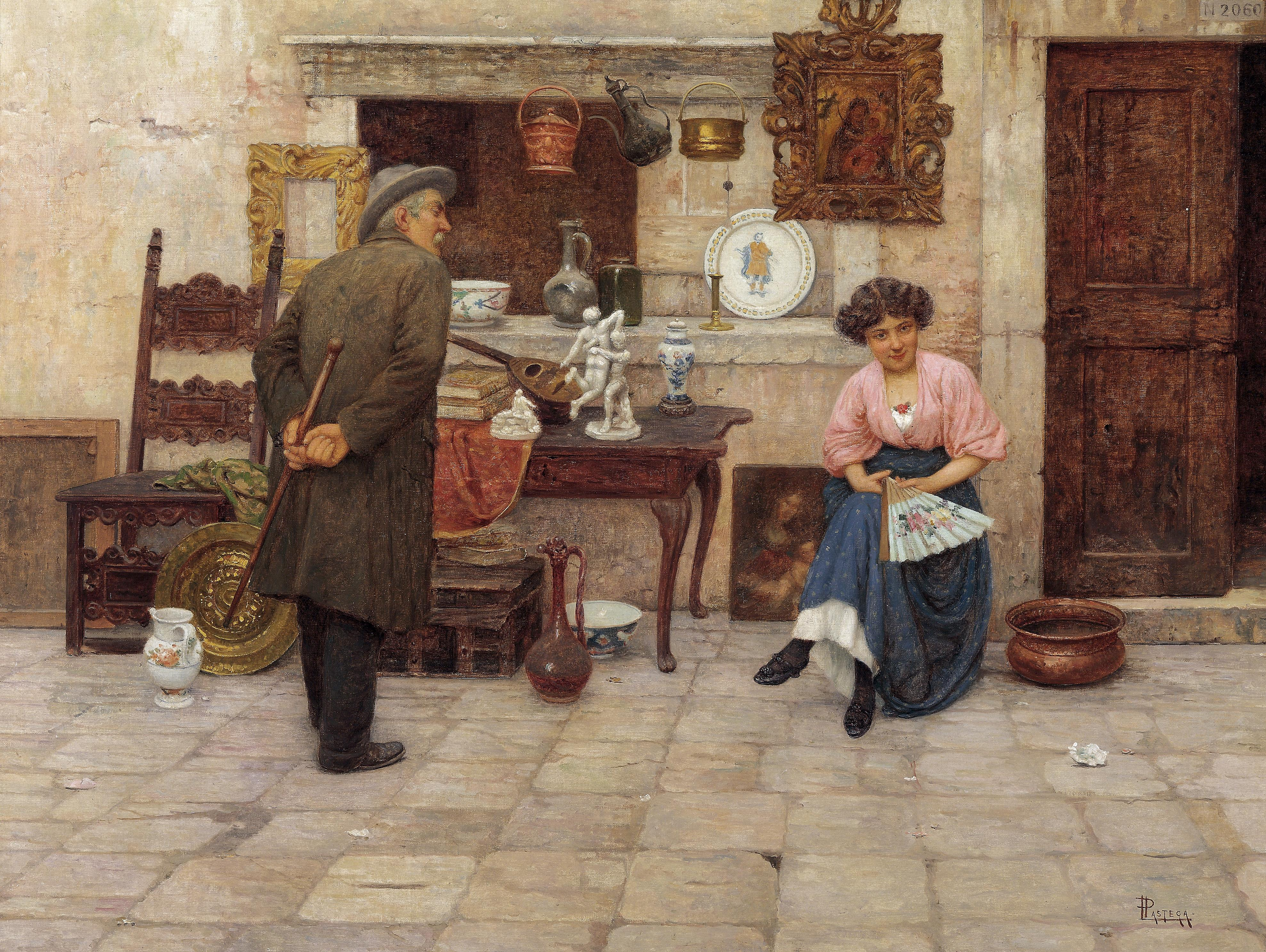
The Antiques Seller

== Biography ==
He was a pupil of Pompeo Marino Molmenti and Napoleone Nani at the Accademia di Belle Arti in his native Venice. He continued to reside in Venice painting vedute and genre subjects in a style that recalled Giacomo Favretto. At Turin, in 1880, he exhibited: Il pasto della gallina; at Milan, in 1881: Sulle fondamenta; at Venice, in 1881: Dame un baso; at the 1882 Promotrice: Il pasto alle galline; in 1883 at Rome: A ti cocoloì; Post prandium; at Turin, in 1884: In un'ora d'ozio and Pecà esser veci!. At the 1887 Venice Exhibition, he sent: Primi saggi; La sagra al nonno; to the 1887 and 1888 Promotrice he sent: a lettera interessante; Una dichiarazione; La fede di stato libero; and a Amore materno.
