= Ferdinando Porcia =

Italian painter (1835–1886)

- Born: October 11, 1835; Bozzolo
- Died: April 20, 1896 (aged 60); Spittal an der Drau

Ferdinando Porcia (11 October 1835–20 April 1896) was an Italian painter, mainly of watercolors.

Italian art historian A. M. Comanduci describes him as Prince Ferdinando di Porcia, who was born in Bozzolo and died in Spittal sulla Drava (now Spittal an der Drau). According to Commanduci, Porcia studied at the Academy of Venice. In the 1850s, Porcia stayed in Vienna with linguist Emilio Teza and biographer Aristide Gabelli. The latter was suffering from homesickness, but the company he had helped him recover. The three stayed friends for the rest of their lives.

He exhibited at Venice in 1887 a Studio of Velasquez; a watercolor depicting Capri, another on the Baths of Tiberius in Capri, and An atelier in Naples. These paintings were exhibited at the National Artistic Exposition. Other artists who exhibited here were Ralph Wormeley Curtis, Ettore Tito, Alessandro Zezzos and Giovanni Fattori. Porcia gave his address as the Hotel Meisl in Vienna.
