= Federico Zandomeneghi =

Italian painter (1841–1917)

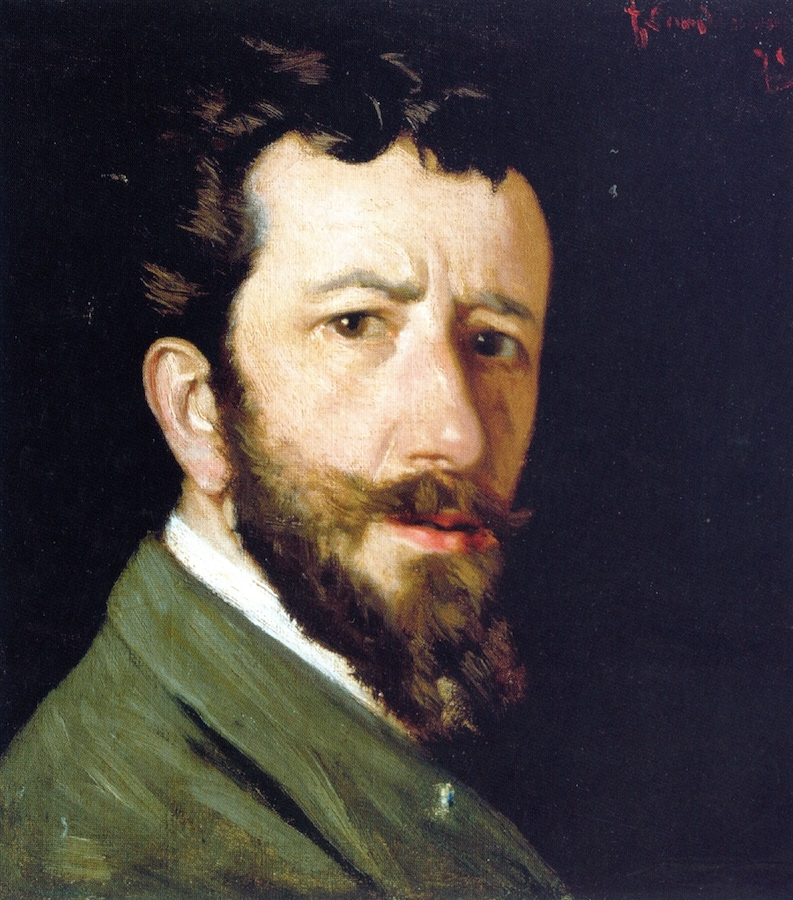
Self-portrait, 1875

Federico Zandomeneghi (Italian pronunciation: [fedeˈriːko ddzandoˈmeːneɡi]; June 2, 1841 – December 31, 1917) was an Italian Impressionist painter.

== Biography ==
Federico Zandomeneghi was born in Venice. His father Pietro and grandfather Luigi were neoclassic sculptors. The latter completed the monument to Titian found in the Frari of Venice. As a young man, he preferred painting to sculpture, enrolling in 1856 first in the Accademia di Belle Arti in Venice, and then in the Academy of Fine Arts of Milan. In 1859, to avoid conscription into the Austrian army, he fled Venice. By the next year in 1860, he tried to join with the forces of Giuseppe Garibaldi (1807–1882) in his Expedition of the Thousand. This made it uncomfortable for him to reside in Venice, leading to a brief incarceration, and in 1862, he moved to Florence for 5 years where he frequented the Caffè Michelangiolo. There he met a number of the artists known as the Macchiaioli, including Signorini, Martorelli, Giovanni Fattori and Giuseppe Abbati, and he joined them in painting landscapes outdoors. Painting outside of the studio, "en plein air", was at that time an innovative approach, allowing for a new vividness and spontaneity in the rendering of light.

By 1866, Zandomeneghi had returned to Venice. In 1871 Pompeo Molmenti wrote glowing assessments of three young Venetian painters: Guglielmo Ciardi, Alessandro Zezzos, and Zandomeneghi. In 1872, he would travel to Rome and paint one of his masterworks; I poverini sui gradini dell'Ara Coeli.

In 1874, he went to Paris, where he spent nearly the rest of his life. He quickly made the acquaintance of the Impressionists, who had just had their first group exhibition. Zandomeneghi, whose style of painting was similar to theirs, would participate in four of their later exhibitions, in 1879, 1880, 1881, and 1886. Like his close friend Edgar Degas he was primarily a figure painter, although Zandomeneghi's work was more sentimental in character than Degas'. He also admired the work of Mary Cassatt and Pierre-Auguste Renoir, and his many paintings of women in their domestic routines follow their example. To supplement the meager returns from the sale of his paintings, Zandomeneghi found work drawing illustrations for fashion magazines.

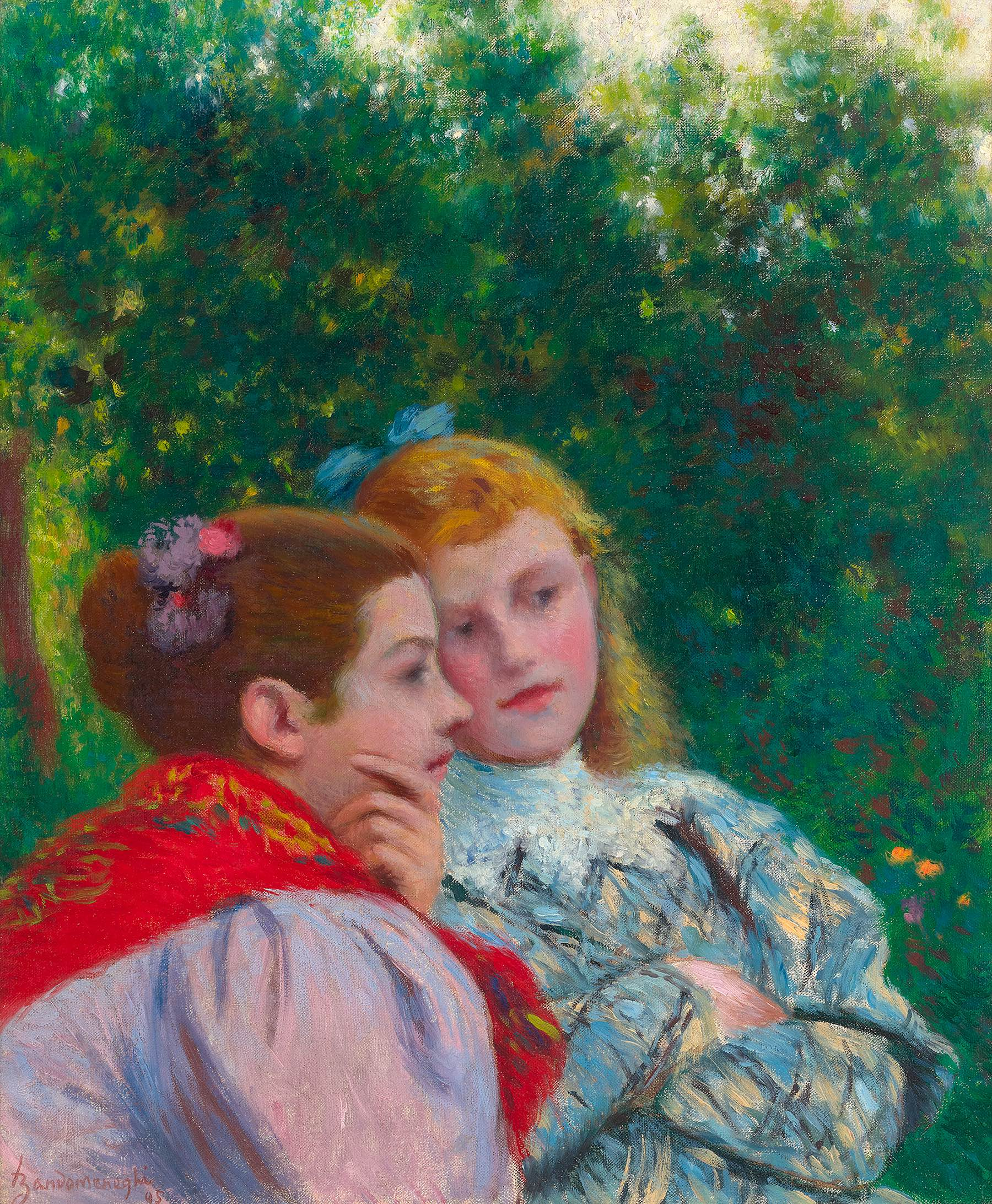
The Two Sisters, 1895. Oil on canvas

He took up working in pastels in the early 1890s, and became especially adept in this medium. At about this time his reputation and his fortunes were enhanced when the art dealer Durand-Ruel showed Zandomeneghi's work in the United States. From then on he enjoyed continuing modest success until his death in Paris in 1917.

== Gallery ==
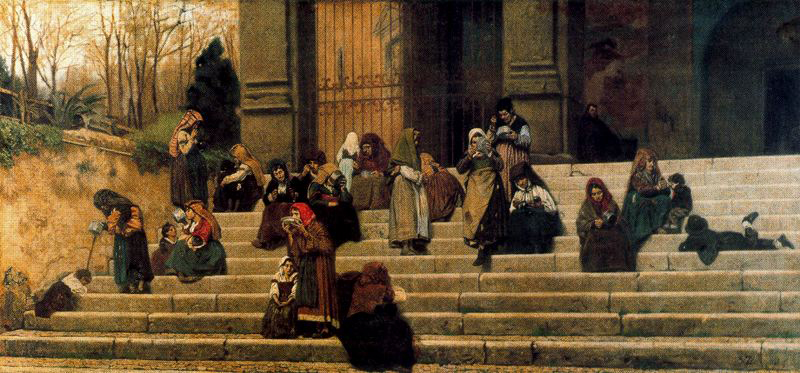
Impressions of Rome, 1872

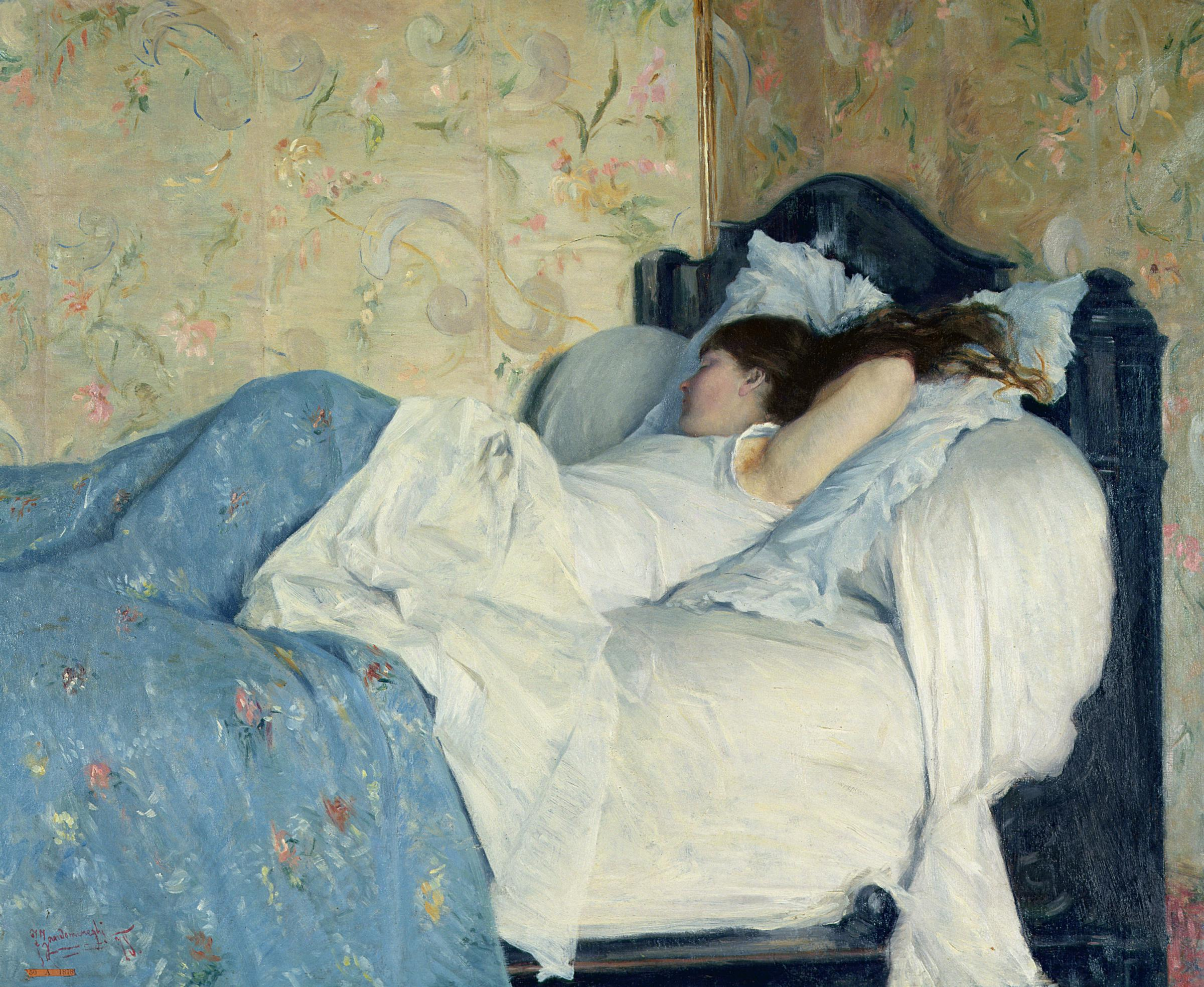
In Bed, 1878

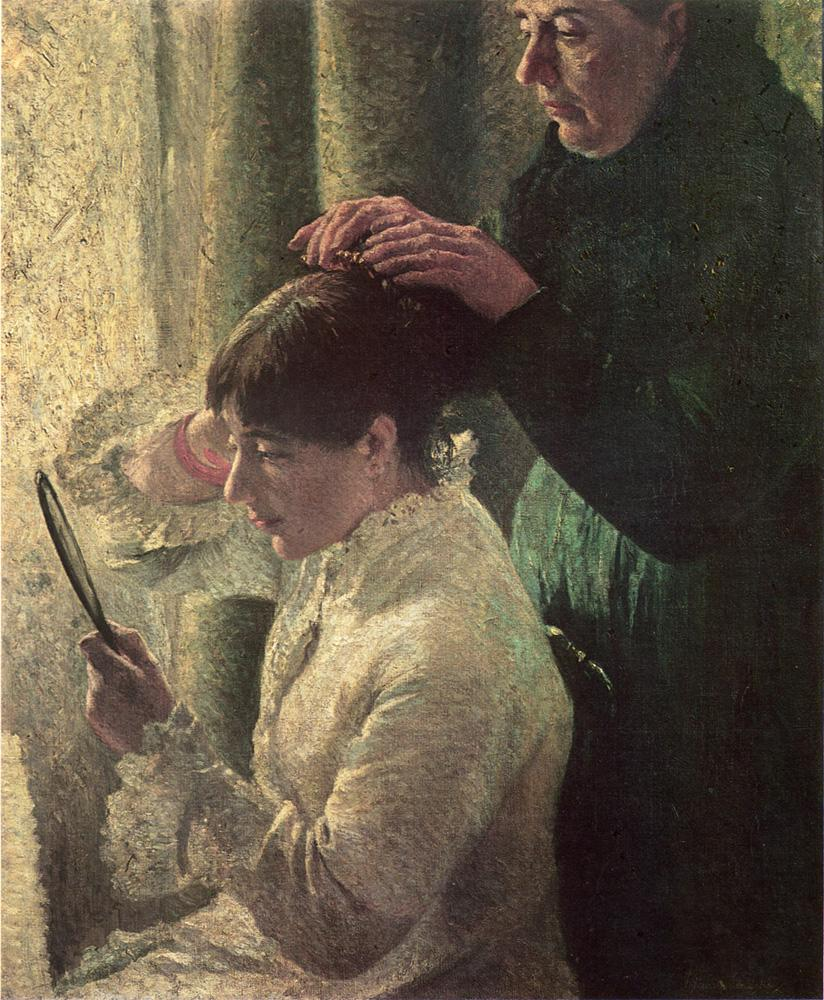
Mother and Daughter, 1879. Oil on canvas

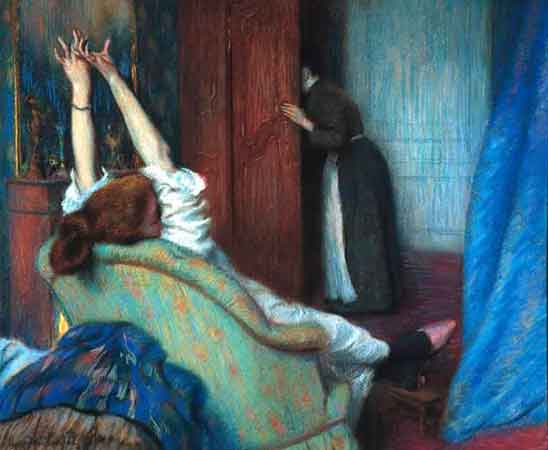
Awakening, c. 1880

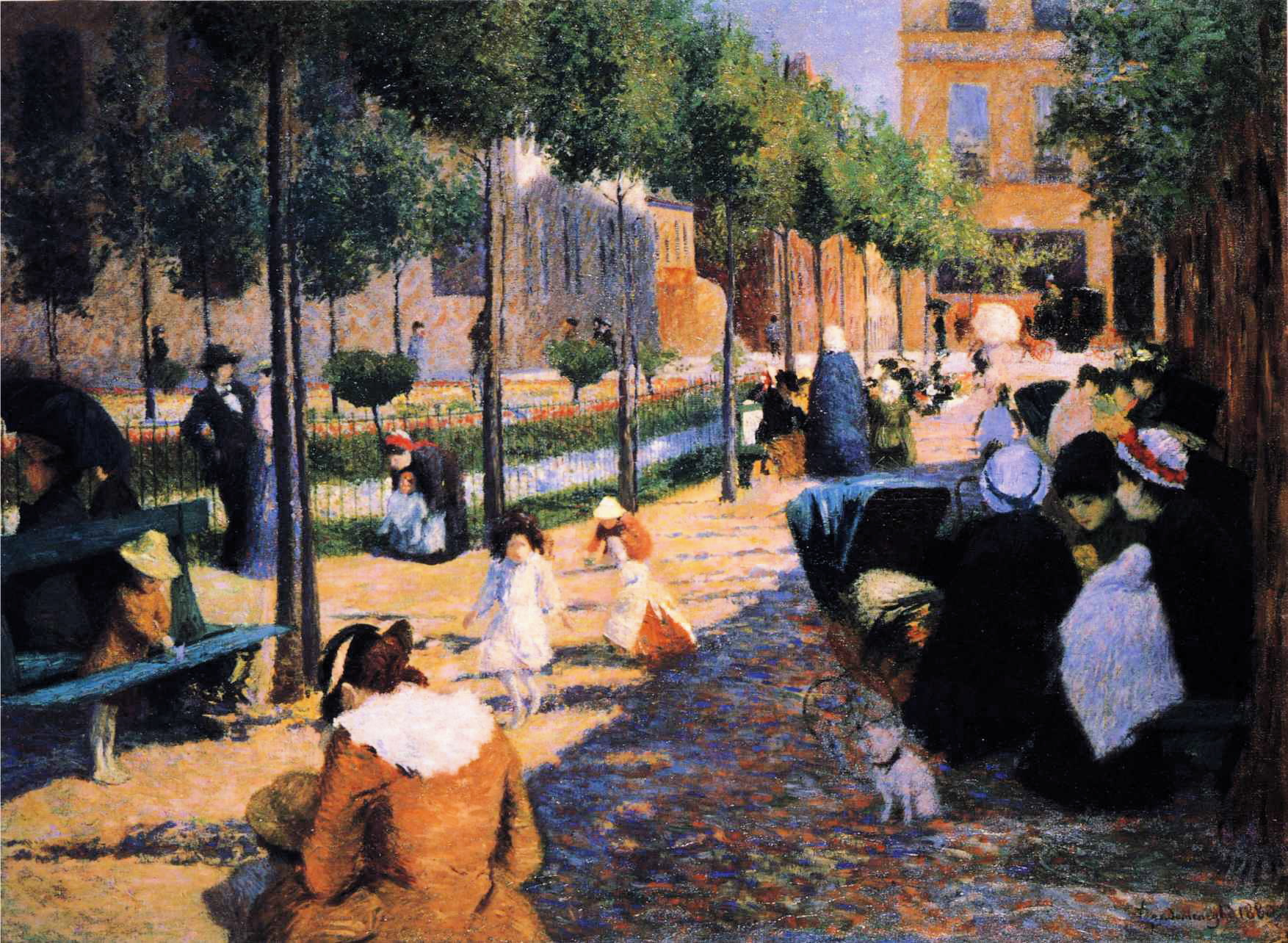
Place d'Anvers, Paris, 1880

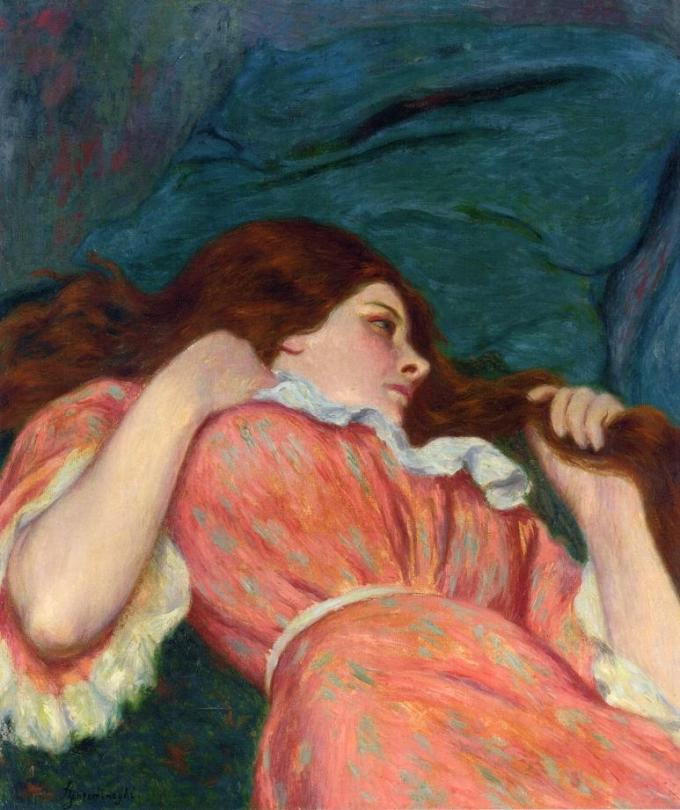
Languor, c. 1890

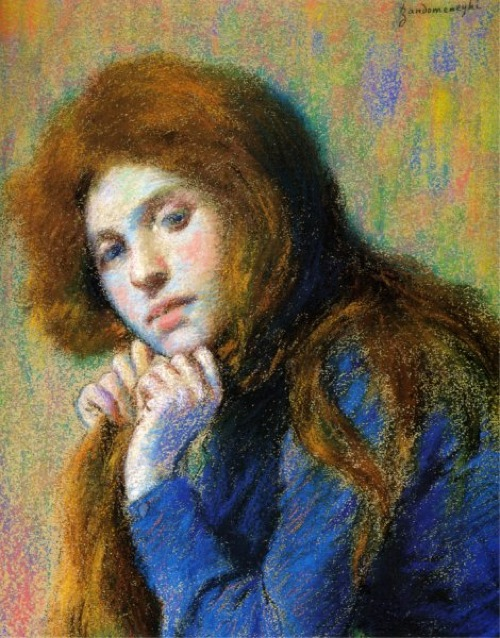
Mathilde, c. 1890

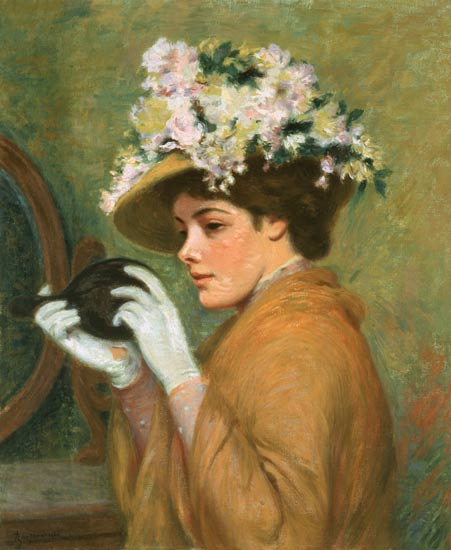
The Last Glance, c. 1890

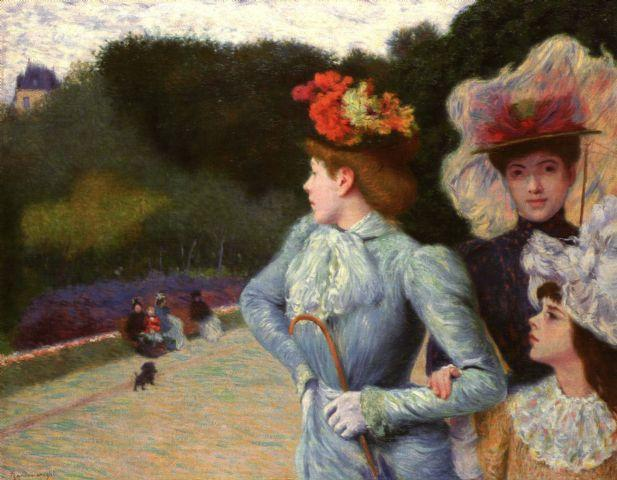
Promenade, c. 1890

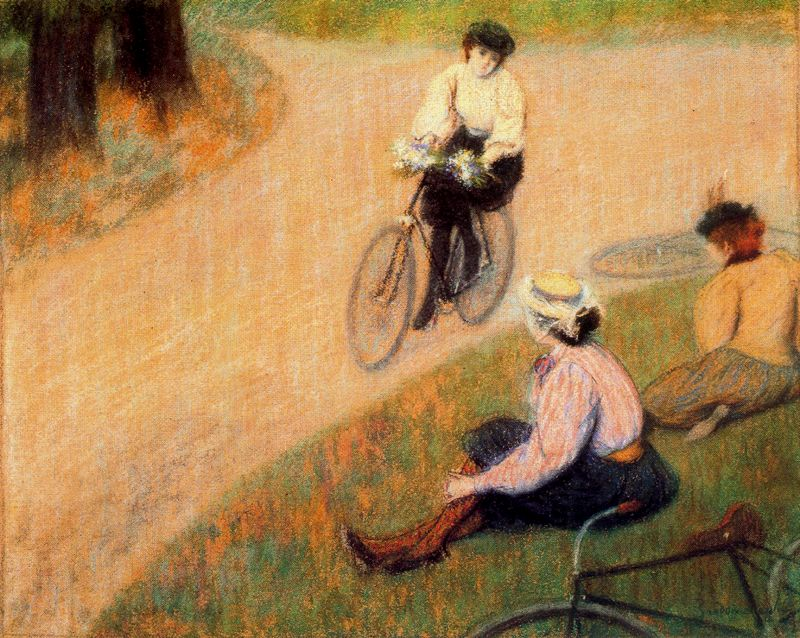
Cycling, 1896
