= Zandomeneghi =

Zandomeneghi is a surname. Notable people with the surname include:

- Federico Zandomeneghi (1841–1917), Italian painter
- Luigi Zandomeneghi (1778-1850), Italian sculptor
- Pietro Zandomeneghi (1806–1886), Italian sculptor
