= Alessandro Milesi =

Alessandro Milesi may refer to:

- Alessandro Milesi (painter) (1856–1945), Italian painter
- Alessandro Milesi (footballer) (born 1999), Peruvian footballer
- Alessandro Milesi (footballer, born 1897), Italian footballer
