= Egisto Lancerotto =

Italian painter (1847–1916)

Egisto Lancerotto (August 21, 1847 – May 31, 1916) was an Italian painter, mainly of genre scenes of Venice.

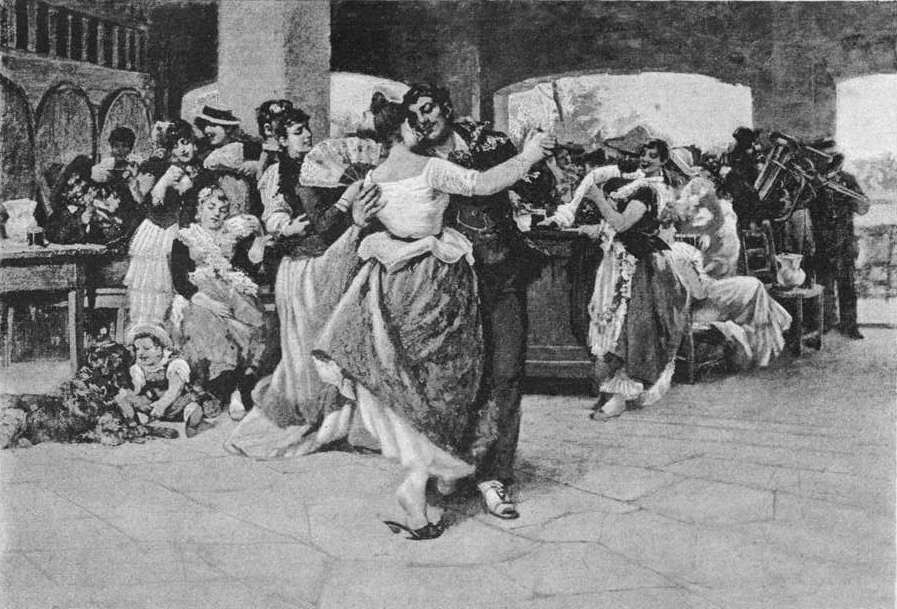
The Tireless (1890)

== Biography ==
He was born in Noale. His father, a bureaucrat in that town, was transferred to Venice when Egisto was young. Lancerotto attended the Venetian Accademia di Belle Arti, where his professors were Napoleone Nani, Michelangelo Grigoletti, Federico Moja, and Pompeo Marino Molmenti. The latter was likely his strongest influence.

Egisto began his career painting with figure paintings, and moved on to large historical paintings in period dress. One of his major works, Ballo di nozze, exhibited in 1887 at Venice. Gubernatis states that he understood the venetians of the street and the campiello, the worker, the porter, the gondolier, the elegant in tatters, the tobacco-smoking old man, the dirty and spoiled young man, and with a singular and rare acumen and keen discernment of their desires, instincts, and appetites.

Among his main works: Delusione sent to Salon of Paris, but lost en route: Le regate at Venice; Due Popolani ai Giardini; La festa degli sposi; Scuola di pittura; Da Mestre at Venice exhibited in 1881; Mezza festa; Breve respiro; Barcaiolo, exhibited at Turin in 1880; A pié d' un ponte; L'Albo, exhibited at Milan in 1881; Esposizione artistica; Loto della pollastra; Capitolo primo, exhibited at Rome in 1883; La Zingara; Preparativi for the notte del Redentore at Venice, sent to the Exhibition of Milan of 1884; Assedio di Florence; Convegno, exhibited at Turin; After the dispute; Fiori di maggio; and Monte Rosa.

Lancerotto died in Venice in 1916.
