= Napoleone Nani =

Italian painter

Napoleone Nani (1841–1899) was an Italian painter, active in Venice, where he became professor of the Accademia di Belle Arti.

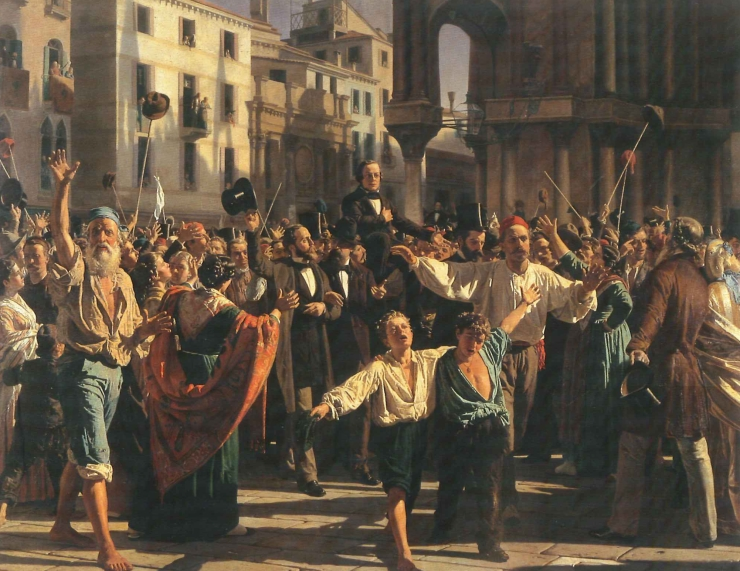
Daniele Manin announcing Republic of Venice

== Biography ==
He was born in Venice. In 1877 at Naples, he displayed his self-portrait and a canvas titled La posa. In 1881 in Venice, he displayed La macchina riposa and il cuore lavora. At the 1883 Promotrice of Florence: Lo studio dal vero; at Rome the same year: Lo studio del nudo and Il primo pensiero ai miei fiori. Successively in Turin, Milan, and Rome, he exhibited: Vizio, Trattative di conciliazione, Giudizio di un intelligente, and Studio. To Venice, in 1887, Studio dal vero and La modella; at the 1889 Florentine Promotrice: In assenza della Maestri. Among his pupils were Giacomo Favretto, Luigi Nono, Alessandro Milesi, and Luigi Pastega. He painted mainly genre works. In 1874, he moved to Verona to direct the local Academy of Fine Arts, the Accademia Cignaroli. He died in Verona in 1899.
