= Sergio Franzoi =

Italian painter (1929–2022)

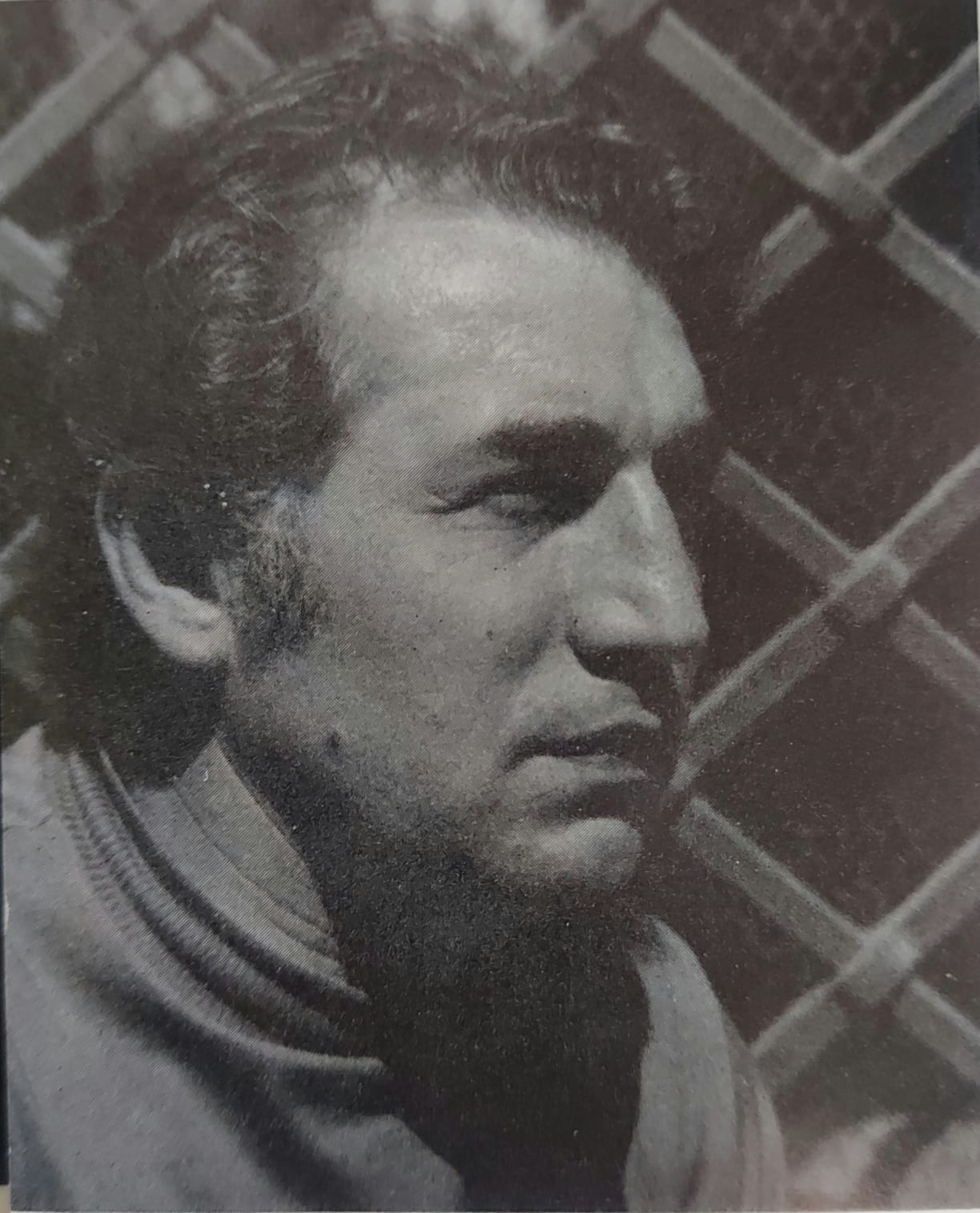
- Born: 10 July 1929; Venice Lido, Kingdom of Italy
- Died: 16 February 2022 (aged 92); Venice, Italy
- Education: Venice Academy of Fine Arts
- Known for: Painting
- Movement: Post-expressionism; Realism

Sergio Franzoi (10 July 1929 – 16 February 2022) was an Italian painter and teacher, one of the last representatives of the post-expressionist venetian current in Italy.

Like other artists, he trained in the collective exhibitions of the Bevilacqua La Masa Foundation. From the early realistic paintings of the fifties, he developed an increasingly personal reinterpretation of expressionism. After twenty years of practice, he reached the point of painting not only human subjects but also biomorphic forms. From 1948 until the first decade of the 2000s he participated in regional, national, and international exhibitions, receiving various awards, including the City of Gallarate Painting Prize in 1950, the Suzzara Prize in 1951 and 1957, and the Burano Prize in 1953 and 1956. His works remain featured today in public and private art exhibitions, both in Italy and abroad.

== Biography ==
Sergio Franzoi was born on the island of Lido di Venezia on 10 July 1929, where he spent his childhood under the fascist regime of Mussolini. He produced a significant portion of his youthful artistic activity before relocating to the city of Venice around the 1960s. His father was a construction contractor in Venice, and it was here that Sergio Franzoi enrolled in the artistic high school in 1943, at the height of World War II. During this period, he developed his initial artistic and painting skills, combining formal education with self-taught activities. He continued his studies in 1947 when he attended the high school of pictorial training (school of painting) at the Academy of Fine Arts in Venice, studying under Giuseppe Cesetti and graduating in 1952.

=== The first steps in collective exhibitions ===
Starting from 1948 until 1963, for fifteen years, Sergio Franzoi substantially participated in almost all the annual exhibitions of the Bevilacqua La Masa Foundation, with the exceptions of the editions in 1951 and 1954. During this period, he won numerous awards for his paintings. The initial works presented in the group exhibitions were characterized by the typical themes of those years. Transitioning from scenes of labor with social undertones ("Pescherecci," 1948, "Pescatori," 1952), the focus shifted to views and landscapes ("Caldonazzo," 1949, "Capanne sulla spiaggia," 1950, "Case a Burano," 1953, "Paesaggio di Marghera" [4], 1953, and "Paesaggio di Malamocco," 1953).

In 1948, at the age of nineteen, while still a student at the Academy of Fine Arts in Venice, Sergio Franzoi participated for the first time in the 36th edition of the Bevilacqua La Masa, presenting the painting "Pescherecci".

In 1956, Franzoi achieved his first notable recognition—an accomplishment marked by a joint third prize in the painting section, shared with Paolo Meneghesso. The paintings presented, which secured him the third position in the artistic award, included "Paesaggio di Olanda" (Landscape of Holland), "Rimorchiatore in laguna" (Tugboat in the Lagoon), and "Paesaggio Olandese" (Dutch Landscape). These three artworks harked back to realistic painting, remaining closely aligned with his early works from preceding years. This inaugural presence at the Venetian exhibition of artists would be followed by numerous others—sixteen in total—each replete with commendations.

=== The success of the fifties and sixties ===
In the 1950s, Franzoi also took part in other painting competitions within the Venetian context, including the Burano Prize on the island of the same name. His entries featured paintings with Venetian lagoon settings, such as "Tramonto" (Sunset) in 1956, which partially echoed the characteristics of his early artistic endeavors. Beyond local competitions, Franzoi's works also began to feature in national exhibitions. He participated in the National Exhibition for Figurative Arts held in Rome in 1950, and showcased his art in various Milanese exhibitions, such as the 1952 Exhibition of Poetic Reality at the Salvetti Gallery and the 1956 San Fedele Painting Prize. Additionally, he took part in the 1958 International Biennial of Youth in Gorizia. Between the late 1950s and the 1960s, Franzoi organized several solo exhibitions with the Bevilacqua la Masa Foundation in 1959, 1961, 1963, and 1967.

In 1960, Franzoi secured the second prize ex aequo with his artwork "Amanti" (Lovers), alongside Miro Romagna, Sergio Perolari, and Domenico Boscolo. All of these painters were proponents of figurative art deeply rooted in tradition. The painting "Amanti" depicted a scene of profound lyricism between two nude figures, surrounded by thick black brushstrokes—a characteristic that would become pivotal in the artist's future productions. The following year, Franzoi once again secured the second place in the painting category at the Bevilacqua competition with his artwork "I sopravvissuti" (The Survivors). This piece continued the figurative art style from the previous edition but altered the composition for a more expansive scope. Instead of featuring two foreground figures, as in the previous work, the new composition depicted four figures, one of whom cradled a child in their arms, following a scheme that could be described as almost archaic. In the same edition, Franzoi also presented another painting, "Il clown" (The Clown), which proved consistent with his earlier works, earning him the second prize the previous year as well. The painting featured a realism evidently influenced by Nordic expressionism, with figures portrayed in sparse tones. These paintings established him as one of the most promising young talents nationally during those years, enabling him to participate in the 1961 Biennale d'Arte Triveneta in Padua and, two years later, in the prestigious National Painting Prize "F. P. Michetti" in Francavilla al Mare.

In those years he had already become an established artist in fact already in 1962 he had exhibited in numerous group exhibitions in Venice and also in other Italian cities including, in addition to those of Rome and Milan . there are in 1951 the National Exhibition of Fine Arts Academies in Naples and in 1959 the National Exhibition of "Aquarium" Painting in Pontedera on the occasion of the IX Pontedera Prize. Furthermore, he had taken part in almost all the group exhibitions of the Bevilacqua La Masa starting from 1948 becoming a well-known name in the Venetian area, ranging also in the national one.

In the meantime, by 1954, Franzoi had become a teacher at the Academy of Fine Arts in Venice—a role he would later relinquish in favor of the position of ornate modeling at the Artistic High School of Venice. He continued to teach in this capacity until his retirement in the early nineties. Throughout the 1950s, he had already garnered numerous accolades in Italy, participating in various art competitions. Notable examples include the 1950 Painting Prize City of Gallarate, the 1953 and 1956 Burano Prize, and the 1951 and 1957 Suzzara Prize. These represent just a few instances of his recognition during that period.

In 1964, after a selection process, Franzoi returned to Rome to participate in the IX Quadriennale, showcasing three works titled Figura n. 1, n. 2, and n. 3. In 1968, his work gained international interest as he exhibited at the VII Biennale del Mediterraneo in Alexandria, Egypt.

=== The first prize of the 50th edition ===
After numerous participations, Franzoi succeeded in winning the 1st prize for painting with the oil painting "Dopo la catastrofe" in the 50th edition of the collective organized by the Fondazione Bevilacqua la Masa between 1962 and 1963.

The jury's choice to award Franzoi the first prize was considered by some as "not very courageous" because it honored a traditional artist. The three paintings presented by Franzoi ("Dopo la catastrofe," "Nudo," and "Uomo con fiore") were indeed examples of figurative art with characteristic features of expressionist painting, marked by thick black outlines and a simplification of forms that would become more relevant in the 1970s, leading to different stylistic outcomes. Specifically, the last painting "Nudo" depicted a reclining female nude figure, portrayed with the rough style and customary black stroke that characterized much of his production during those years. Subsequently, Franzoi abandoned naturalistic representation in favor of an increasingly sparse painting style, with organic but no longer figurative references.

The first prize awarded to Franzoi by the jury during the 50th edition remains one of the most emblematic instances of the classically traditionalist approach maintained by the Venetian foundation in the 1960s. This painting, along with other works, is now housed in the International Gallery of Modern Art at Ca' Pesaro in Venice.

=== The seventies and the mosaic in the former Hospital at the Sea in Lido di Venezia ===
During the subsequent 1970s, now a mature artist, Franzoi presented himself as such in various solo exhibitions in Venice. Among them, there was the one held at the Querini Stampalia in 1970, another organized the following year at the Art Gallery "Il Traghetto," and another in 1973 in Mestre at the "Acquario" Gallery. He also participated in several painting competitions, including the 1971 Painting Prize in Bassano Del Grappa and the 1979 Painting Prize "Carlo Dalla Zorza" in Asolo. In 1974, he took part in the National Exhibition of Figurative Arts at the Sforza Castle in Milan.

In his artistic life, Franzoi also produced some cartoons and canvases for mosaics with abstract decorative motifs. Noteworthy is the work developed in 1975, comprising a series of five drawings or preparatory cartoons composed of five mosaic subjects commissioned to the Musaicisti School of Friuli on behalf of the former Civil Hospital of Lido di Venezia. The cartoons were created using a mixed technique, employing tempera painting or tessellation.

Specifically, the produced works depict "arrows," all traceable to the same abstract creative nucleus characterized by chromatic tones that play with the idea of movement. The non-scientific tessellation technique enhances the dynamism of the works, making the "carpet-cartoons" themselves colorful and almost ornamental. In particular, subjects 3 and 4 of the sketches feature a central whole figure surrounded by other fragmented abstract figures that appear elongated and marked with blue-azure tones and reddish spots. In the background, there are lighter shades of white and golden beige. The extreme dynamism of the works is fundamentally attributed to two recurring elements: the first involves the choice of using light colors for the background, conveying a sense of movement, and the second is the use of guiding lines represented by white lines connecting the various figures to the exterior. The "tessellation" technique used by Franzoi for the execution of the cartoons already clarifies the result of the work. The entire piece was then created using marbles and enamels, with direct processing on a concrete slab through application with cement adhesive.

The completed mosaic is now visible inside the former Civil Hospital of Lido di Venezia in the area of the indoor pool overlooking the beach, on the northeast wall of the complex. The drawings and preparatory cartoons are preserved in Spilimbergo, in the province of Pordenone, at the Gallery and Archive of the Scuola Mosaicisti del Friuli.

=== The end of the artistic career and death ===
From the 1980s onwards, Franzoi's participation in group exhibitions decreased, giving way to several solo exhibitions in 1989, 1998, and 2000.

One of the culminating moments in his artistic journey can be defined by the exhibition and seminar in 1982, in which Franzoi participated. The event was organized in Venice by the Department of History and Criticism of the Arts at Ca' Foscari University, upon the invitation of the renowned art critic Giuseppe Mazzariol. Additionally, he took part in the 1984 exhibition-event at the Bevilacqua La Masa Gallery, titled "Cronaca 1947-1967." He also participated in the exhibition-event of 1984 at the Gallery Bevilacqua La Masa Foundation entitled "Cronaca 1947-1967".

The last decades of his artistic journey were characterized by refined and elegant explorations of the female nude; distinctive signs and colors came together in his artworks to rediscover the human body as a kind of landscape.

Franzoi concluded his career in the early 2000s after over sixty years of artistic activity, participating in his final exhibitions.

Sergio Franzoi died in Venice on 16 February 2022, at the age of 92. He is buried in the monumental cemetery of "San Michele" on the island of Venice.

== Style ==
Sergio Franzoi approached painting from an original experience, such as the sight of the sea, fishermen hauling their nets on the beach against the grand reflection of the sun on the waves, the ever-changing and captivating emergence of phenomena against the infinite and dazzling background of light, the uncertain and enticing boundary between the familiar and the unknown. These images are evident in his early works, but soon the captivating and intriguing universe of eros will draw him in.

Still beaches or undetermined places where the orgy of deafening rhythms has not yet invaded, the sickly putrefaction of post-bathing, the uncontrollable avalanche of advertising. Spaces where dreams dance on the trajectories of gazes - unfathomable paths of desire - where unforeseen adventures, sweet unions, penetrations, warm embraces blossom in the soft blending of flesh. Giuseppe Mazzariol once defined them as "intense landscapes of life," stating, "... Nothing else. Sometimes the flower of a mouth emerges, the delicate almond of the eye or sex opens to presence. A great calm rises from these supine traces where white prevails and unifies." In fact, figures and landscapes blur as the imagination ventures into paths destined to be lost in the whirlwind of fantasy, in an inexhaustible succession of encounters and situations. However, one should not think, in Franzoi's case, of an easy narrative painting. He is not, in fact, a quiet naturalistic painter simply intent on reproducing what he sees. He is well aware of the autonomy of painting, acknowledging that art has its own laws, constructions, paths, and that mysterious and wonderful are the connections that link it to the world. Franzoi's approach to the essentially metaphorical language of painting is anything but naive. He not only recognizes its freedoms but also senses the possible wear and tear, the ever-present risk of aphasia, perhaps due to representative virtuosity, redundancy, banal repetitiveness, or excess sensitivity. Not by chance, precisely to avoid such dangers, he self-limits by forcing his innate qualities into deliberately harsh and difficult itineraries. A highly gifted painter, in many respects, he approaches the image plastically, as a sculptor, subtly disrupting the very foundations of traditional painting construction. In this way, chiaroscuro is almost eliminated in favor of the imminence and almost physicality of the surface, while the texture of volumes is translated into the challenging complexity of articulated formal hieroglyphs. Meanwhile, color loses its usual permeating property, not spreading across zones but rather concentrating in contrasting and seemingly external streaks, or allusively coagulating along linear contours. The painting thus explicitly lives a dual nature as both a physical and virtual space. To become part of it, the real must pass through the filter of the psyche, imagination, reason, instinct, finding a particular and unique configuration that transforms the phenomenon, things, the world, into an icon. Of course, Franzoi does not undertake such a challenging task without equipping himself with appropriate tools: in his works, memories of the silhouettes of French-language Maremman hippodromes emerge intact here and there, the refined teachings of Braque, dreamy fantasies of Klee, the very elegant enveloping undulations of Modigliani, and perhaps with greater insistence, the more tormented and venomous echoes of the linearisms of Klimt and Schiele. However, this is not just a refined repertoire of stylistic juxtapositions, as evidenced by the fact that the very way of composing the painting has undergone radical changes over time. While in his early works, the image appeared "centered," almost dominating space, now it seems to be scattered across the entire surface, probably signifying the loss of every certainty and foundation typical of our era. Yet, as the great Virgilio Guidi wrote, with Franzoi's painting, we are still "... in the regions of man." There is indeed an irrepressible trust of ancient humanistic origin guiding and supporting his struggle against interchangeability and the infinite multiplicities that seem to characterize the chaotic world in which we are immersed. For Franzoi, each painting, each work must distinguish itself by virtue of its form, the result of an irreproducible connection established between existence and totality. Only the rigor of form can allow for some dignity—a word that has become obsolete in everyday vocabulary—understood also as the possibility of comparison and judgment, in a constant moral tension for the better.

Sergio Franzoi, is characterized by a reserved and stern manner, combined with a restrained and gentle disposition. His work addresses the role of love as a universal force that connects beings and contributes to their flourishing. In this regard, his position recalls the account of love given by Phaedrus in Plato’s Symposium:

"[...] In reality, what must guide the entire life of those destined to live beautifully is something that neither kinship, nor honors, nor wealth, nor anything else can instill in us with such beauty, except love. And by this, what do I mean? I mean the shame for low deeds and the aspiration to noble things: without them, neither a city nor an individual can accomplish great and beautiful deeds." - Excerpt from the speech of Phaedrus from the work ' 'Symposium by Plato. Verses 178 [c] and [d].

== Exhibition activity ==
- 1948 - Venice, 36th Collective Gallery Bevilacqua La Masa
- 1949 - Venice, National Exhibition of Fine Arts Academies
- 1949 - Venice, 37th Collective Gallery Bevilacqua La Masa
- 1950 - Rome, National Exhibition for the Figurative Arts
- 1950 - Venice, 38th Collective Gallery Bevilacqua La Masa
- 1950 - Gallarate, National Award for Painting City of Gallarate
- 1951 - Naples, National Exhibition of Fine Arts Academies
- 1951 - Venice, Burano Prize Exhibition
- 1951 - Suzzara, IV Suzzara Prize
- 1951 - Venice, 39th Collective Gallery Bevilacqua La Masa
- 1951 - Venice, Del Delta Exhibition
- 1952 - Venice, Group of 8 Young Painters
- 1952 - Rome, II Youth Cultural Olympics
- 1952 - Venice, 40th Bevilacqua La Masa Collective
- 1952 - Milan, Exhibition of Poetic Reality - Salvetti Gallery
- 1953 - Venice, Burano Prize Exhibition
- 1953 - Milan, National Exhibition of Fine Academies
- 1953 - Venice, 41st Bevilacqua La Masa Collective
- 1955 - Cesenatico, IV Cesenatico Painting Prize
- 1955 - Venice, 43rd Bevilacqua La Masa Collective
- 1955 - Legnago, City of Legnago Painting Prize
- 1956 - Venice, Burano Prize Exhibition
- 1956 - Milan, San Fedele Painting Prize
- 1956 - Venice, 44th Bevilacqua La Masa Collective
- 1956 - Mirano, City of Mirano Painting Prize
- 1957 - Suzzara, X Suzzara Prize
- 1957 - Venice, 45th Collective Gallery Bevilacqua La Masa
- 1958 - Gorizia, VI International Exhibition of Figurative Arts
- 1958 - Bergamo, Dalmine Prize
- 1958 - Venice, 46th Collective Gallery Bevilacqua La Masa
- 1959 - Pontedera, IX Pontedera Prize - National Exhibition of "Aquarium" Painting
- 1959 - Venice, 47th Collective Gallery Bevilacqua La Masa
- 1959 - Venice, Exhibition of Awarded Artists - Collective Gallery B.LM.
- 1959 - Venice, Personal Exhibition at the Bevilacqua La Masa Gallery
- 1960 - Venice, 48th Collective Gallery Bevilacqua La Masa
- 1961 - Padua, XIV Triveneta Art Biennial
- 1961 - Copparo, Copparo Award for Interregional Art Exhibition
- 1961 - Venice, Personal Exhibition at the Bevilacqua la Masa Gallery
- 1961 - Venice, Collective of Venetian Painters
- 1961 - Venice, 49th Collective Gallery Bevilacqua La Masa
- 1962 - Venice, Il Canale Gallery - Exhibition of Young Venetian Painters
- 1962 - Rovigo, Interprovincial Art Exhibition
- 1962 - Venice, 50th Collective Gallery Bevilacqua La Masa
- 1963 - Francavilla al Mare, XVII National Prize for Painting "F.P. Michetti"
- 1963 - Venice, Personal Exhibition at the Bevilacqua La Masa Gallery
- 1963 - Venice, 51st Collective Gallery Bevilacqua La Masa
- 1964 - Venice, 52nd Bevilacqua La Masa Collective
- 1965 - Rome, IX Quadrennial National Art Exhibition
- 1965 - Venice, VIII Mestre Painting Prize
- 1965 - Venice, 53rd Collective Gallery Bevilacqua La Masa
- 1966 - Venice, Exhibition of Venetian Painters
- 1966 - Venice, IX Mestre Painting Prize
- 1966 - Venice, Collective Gallery "Contarini"
- 1967 - Padua, "Il Sigillo" Gallery Personal Exhibition
- 1967 - Venice, X Mestre Painting Prize
- 1967 - Venice, Personal Exhibition at the Bevilacqua La Masa Gallery
- 1968 - Alexandria, Egypt, VII International Biennial of the Mediterranean
- 1968 - Vicenza, "Al Cenacolo" Gallery Personal Exhibition
- 1970 - Venice, "Querini Stampalia" Foundation Personal Exhibition
- 1970 - Venice, La Toleta Gallery "The Golden Marengo"
- 1971 - Bassano, Bassano Del Grappa Painting Award
- 1971 - Venice, "Il Traghetto" Gallery Personal Exhibition
- 1971 - Venice, Mestre Collective Gallery "Acquario"
- 1972 - Venice, Venetian Painters Homage to Diego Valeri
- 1972 - Venice, Personal Exhibition Mestre Galleria "Acquario"
- 1973 - Venice, Youth of the 50s - S.Vidal Art Gallery
- 1974 - Milan, Castello Sforzesco National Exhibition of Figurative Arts
- 1979 - Asolo, "Carlo Dalla Zorza" Painting Award
- 1982 - Venice, University of Artistic Discipline Institute
- 1984 - Venice, Chronicle 1947-1967 Galleria Bevilacqua La Masa
- 1989 - Venice, Personal Exhibition at the Ferry Gallery
- 1998 - Venice, Personal Exhibition Hotel Bel Sito
- 2000 - Venice, Multigraphic Gallery Personal Exhibition

== Main awards and recognitions ==
- 1950 - First place: City of Gallarate Painting Prize
- 1951 - First place: Suzzara Prize
- 1953 - First place: Burano Prize
- 1956 - First place: Burano Prize
- 1956 - Third place: prize in the painting section of the 44th collective Fondazione Bevilacqua La Masa
- 1957 - First place: Suzzara Prize
- 1960 - Second Place: prize in the painting section of the 48th collective Fondazione Bevilacqua La Masa
- 1961 - Second Place: prize in the painting section of the 49th collective Fondazione Bevilacqua La Masa
- 1962 - First place: prize in the painting section of the 50th collective Fondazione Bevilacqua La Masa

== Works in collections ==
- "Amanti", oil on canvas, 75 x 100 cm, sec. XX, A0355, Fondazione Musei Civici di Venezia - Ca' Pesaro, International Gallery of Modern Art;
- "Dopo la catastrofe", oil on canvas, sec. XX, 127 x 151 cm, BA0424, Fondazione Musei Civici di Venezia - Ca' Pesaro, International Gallery of Modern Art;
- "Il Clown", oil on canvas, 72 x 72 cm, sec. XX, BA0377, Fondazione Musei Civici di Venezia - Ca' Pesaro, International Gallery of Modern Art;
- "Paesaggio", oil on canvas, 74 x 89 cm, sec. XX, BA0531, Fondazione Musei Civici di Venezia - Ca' Pesaro, International Gallery of Modern Art;
- "Paesaggio di Marghera", oil on canvas, 75 x 70 cm, sec. XX, BA0156, Fondazione Musei Civici di Venezia - Ca' Pesaro, International Gallery of Modern Art.

== See also ==
- Academy of Fine Arts of Venice
- Querini Stampalia Foundation
- International Gallery of Modern Art, Ca' Pesaro
- Expressionism (artistic movement)

== Bibliography ==
- Sergio Franzoi Galleria Multigraphic, Introduction by D. Marangon, Catalog of the Personal Exhibition (Galleria Multigraphic Venice), Nuova Tipografia snc, 2000;
- Giulio Mariotti, "A happier moment than the present" The annual collective exhibitions of the Opera Bevilacqua La Masa from 1958 to 1967, Ca' Foscari University, 2011-2012, pp. 49, 50, 59, 75, 76, 88, 92, 116, 120, 131, 134, 171, 194-197, 234;
- Margherita Divari, The Opera Bevilacqua La Masa in Venice: the recovery of exhibition activity after the Second World War (1947-1955), Ca' Foscari University, 2012-2013, pp. 96, 102, 112, 125, 127, 140;
- Franzoi, exhibition catalog (Mestre, Galleria Acquario), Mestre 1972;
- G. Nonveiller, Collective exhibitions. Outline for a history of the visual arts in Venice in the sixties. Notes on the Seventies, in Emblemi d'Arte. From Boccioni to Tancredi. One hundred years of the Bevilacqua La Masa Foundation 1899-1999;
- 46th collective exhibition of the Opera Bevilacqua La Masa, catalog of the exhibition (Venice, Galleria Bevilacqua La Masa), Stamperia di Venezia, Venice 1958;
- 47th collective exhibition of the Opera Bevilacqua La Masa, catalog of the exhibition (Venice, Galleria Bevilacqua La Masa), Stamperia di Venezia, Venice 1959;
- Exhibition of the awarded artists from 1952 to 1959, catalog of the exhibition (Venice, Galleria Bevilacqua La Masa), Printing house of Venice, Venice 1959;
- 48th collective exhibition of the Opera Bevilacqua La Masa, catalog of the exhibition (Venice, Galleria Bevilacqua La Masa), Printing works of Venice, Venice 1960;
- Archive of the Bevilacqua La Masa Institution, Collective Annual Exhibitions Series, envelope 91, 1984;
- Those admitted to the Bevilacqua La Masa collective. The traditional Christmas exhibition, in "Il Gazzettino", 14 December 1961;
- Those admitted to the Bevilacqua La Masa collective. The traditional Christmas exhibition, in "Il Gazzettino", 14 December 1961;
- Inauguration of the Bevilacqua La Masa collective, in "Il Gazzettino", 22 December 1961;
- 49th collective exhibition of the Opera Bevilacqua La Masa, catalog of the exhibition (Venice, Galleria Bevilacqua La Masa), Stamperia di Venezia, Venice 1961;
- The fiftieth collective exhibition of Bevilacqua La Masa, in "Il Gazzettino", 22 December 1962;
- 50th collective exhibition of the Opera Bevilacqua La Masa, catalog of the exhibition (Venice, Galleria Bevilacqua La Masa), Stamperia di Venezia, Venice 1962;
- 51st Collective Exhibition of the Opera Bevilacqua La Masa, catalog of the exhibition (Venice, Galleria Bevilacqua La Masa), Printing House of Venice, Venice 1963;
- P. Garbizza, The 50th collective Bevilacqua La Masa, in "Il Veneto", 24 January 1963;
- Inauguration of the Bevilacqua La Masa collective, in "Il Gazzettino", 22 December 1964;
- 52nd Collective Exhibition of the Opera Bevilacqua La Masa, catalog of the exhibition (Venice, Galleria Bevilacqua La Masa), Printing House of Venice, Venice 1964;
- Collective exhibition at the "Canale" of excluded artists, in "Il Gazzettino", 22 December 1965;
- The 54th Collective Review inaugurated at Bevilacqua, in "Il Gazzettino", 22 July 1966;
- 54th collective exhibition of the Opera Bevilacqua La Masa, catalog of the exhibition (Venice, Galleria Bevilacqua La Masa), Stamperia di Venezia, Venice 1966;
- The group show opens at Bevilacqua La Masa, in "Il Gazzettino", 22 December 1967;
- 55th collective exhibition of the Opera Bevilacqua La Masa, catalog of the exhibition (Venice, Galleria Bevilacqua La Masa), Stamperia di Venezia, Venice 1967;
- Cronaca 1947-1967, catalog of the exhibition (Venice, Galleria Bevilacqua La Masa), Tipografia Commerciale Venezia, Venice 1984;
- The Bevilacqua La Masa Collective is open, in "Il Gazzettino", 24 December 1953;
- The painting of the exhibition at Bevilacqua La Masa, in "Il Gazzettino", 16 November 1949;
- 39th Collective Exhibition of the Opera Bevilacqua La Masa, catalog of the exhibition (Venice, Sala dell'Opera Bevilacqua la Masa at the Ascension, 5 April-15 May 1952) Municipality of Venice, 1952;
- 40th Collective Exhibition of the Opera Bevilacqua La Masa, catalog of the exhibition (Venice, Sala dell'Opera Bevilacqua la Masa all'Ascensione, 23 December 1952 -31 January 1953) Comune di Venezia, 1952;
- 41st Collective Exhibition of the Opera Bevilacqua La Masa, catalog of the exhibition (Venice, Sala dell'Opera Bevilacqua la Masa all'Ascensione, 23 December 1953 -31 January 1954) Municipality of Venice, 1953;
- 43rd Collective Exhibition of the Opera Bevilacqua La Masa, exhibition catalog (Venice, Sale dell'Opera Bevilacqua La Masa all'Ascensione, 23 December 1955 - 30 January 1956), Venice 1955;
- XXXVI Collective Exhibition of the Opera Bevilacqua La Masa, catalog of the exhibition (Venice, Sale dell'Opera Bevilacqua la Masa all'Ascensione, 8 December 1948- 9 January 1949) Municipality of Venice, 1948;
- XXXVII Collective Exhibition of the Opera Bevilacqua La Masa, catalog of the exhibition (Venice, Sale dell'Opera Bevilacqua la Masa all'Ascensione, 15 November - 15 December 1949) Municipality of Venice, 1949;
- XXXVIII Collective Exhibition of the Opera Bevilacqua La Masa, exhibition catalog (Venice, Sala Napoleonica, 28 October-30 November 1950) Comune di Venezia, 1950;
- Burano Prize 1951, Room 5, n.83; Burano Prize 1956, sp. and ill. sn; Triveneto 1961; Michetta Award 1963; Quadrennial 1965-1966, p. 118; Alexandria Biennial 1968;
- SF, Querini Stampalia foundation, Venice 1970;
- Chronicle 1947-1967, Galleria "Opera Bevilacqua La Masa", Venice 1984, pp. 124–125 ill;
- F. Edited by G. Mazzariol, exhibition brochure, Galleria Il Traghetto, Venice 1989.
