= Pompeo Marino Molmenti =

Italian painter (1819–1894)

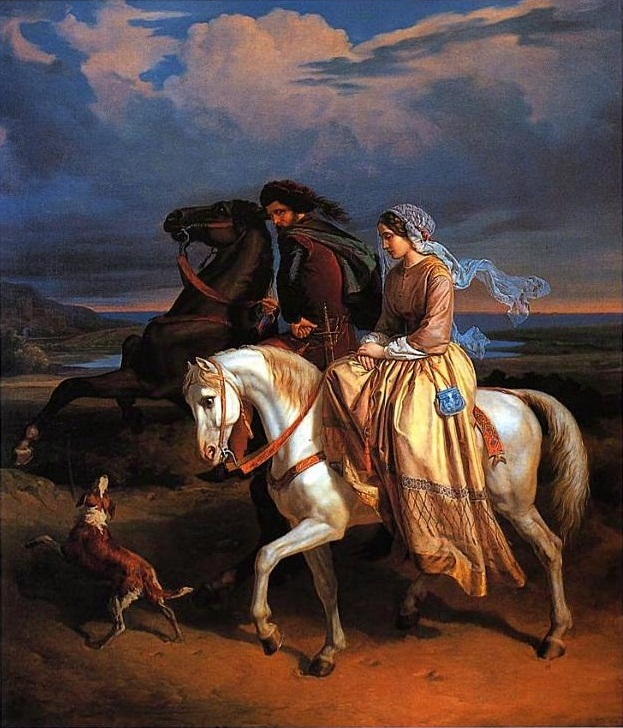
Pia de' Tolomei taken to Maremma, from the Purgatorio by Dante

Pompeo Marino Molmenti (8 November 1819 in Villanova in Motta di Livenza – 17 December 1894 in Venice) was an Italian painter.

== Biography ==
He was born in Friuli to Francesco Molmenti, an engineer of comfortable means, who had followed his older brother, Ettore, to Venice. When he was orphaned as a boy, Pompeo was cared for by his uncle Ettore, who encouraged his studies. In 1834, he was enrolled in the Accademia di Belle Arti di Venezia to study under Ludovico Lipparini, Odorico Politi, and Michelangelo Grigoletti. As a student he painted a Murder of Caesar.

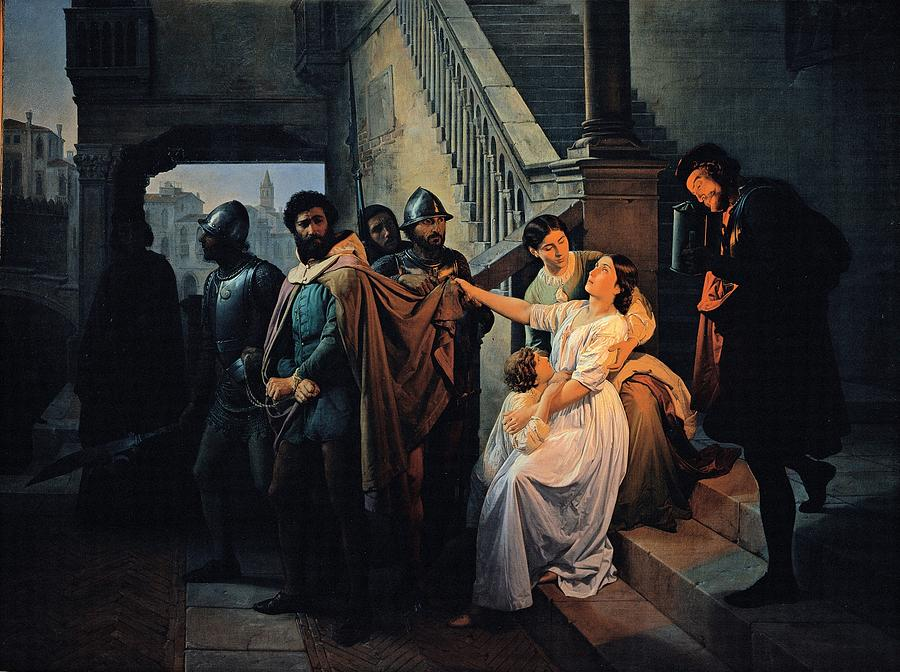
The Arrest of Filippo Calendario

One of his early patrons was Count Spiridione Papadopoli (1799–1859) and his wife, Teresa Mosconi, who owned a villa in Villanova, not far from Molmenti's birthplace. As a young man, he had painted a Death of Othello for the Papadopoli family. A second version was completed in 1866. During 1835 to 1840, Molmenti painted a Madonna and child for a lunette at the private oratory of the Papadopolis, which recalled the Renaissance Madonna Giovanelli of Giovanni Bellini. He painted a Santa Teresa (now lost) for the countess, and a San Paolo (destroyed) for the church of San Polo di Piave.

From 1843 to 1844, he accompanied the Duke Saverio di Blancas on a trip through Syria and Greece. During this time he drew many Arab subjects, and painted The Departure of Tobias with Rachel from the House of Laban for his patron Count Papadopoli and Sara gives Agar as wife to Abraham. He then traveled to Florence, Rome, Paris, and Munich. During 1848–1849, he participated in some of the patriotic uprisings.

In 1850, he displayed three paintings: Cimabue discovers in Giotto the Genius of Painting (now lost), a Holy Family copied from the Raphael painting Madonna della seggiola, and a Virgin and child and a St Ursula for the church of Sant'Orsola of Conegliano, now displayed in the duomo. He painted an Immaculate Conception for Malo near Vicenza; a Martyrdom of Santa Filomena for Vidor; a San Rocco for a church of Palmanova; and Jesus gives the key to St Peter for Fontanelle.

In 1851, he became professor at the Academy of Fine Arts, Venice and worked alongside Pietro Selvatico to reform the institution. Among his pupils were Antonio Beni, Giacomo Favretto, Luigi Nono, Bressanesi, Luigi Pastega, Egisto Lancerotto, Tranquillo Cremona, Napoleone Nani, Silvio Rotta and Ettore Tito. He was knighted for the Order of the Crown of Italy.

In 1853 he exhibited a painting on the subject of Pia de' Tolomei, commissioned by the architect Count Giacomo Franco and now in the Museo Civico di Castelvecchio. He also painted an Arrest of Filippo Calendario (1854) commissioned by Princess Giovanelli.
