= Giovanni Squarcina =

Italian painter

Giovanni Squarcina (September 11, 1825 – 1891) was an Italian painter.

== Biography ==
Squarcina was born in Zadar, Croatia. During his youth, his natural inclination for painting, was challenged by his father, who intended his son to become a jeweller. At 17 years, his mother took him to Venice, where he began studies at the Venetian Academy of Fine Arts from 1842 to 1848. He was sent to Rome on a government stipend. Returning to Venice he completes a massive (19 by 13 feet) canvas: The abjuration by Galileo Galilei before the Tribunal of the Inquisition. This work, which took ten years to complete, and proved hard to sell. He also completed small paintings and portraits. His paintings were lauded at Expositions of Fine Arts at principal cities of Italy. At the 1881 Mostra of Fine Arts in Venice, he exhibits: Un villanella abbigliato da festa and a portrait of Garibaldi. In the same year at Milan: L'Orgia. At the 1888 Exposition at Bologna, he exhibits: Parasole.
