= Santa Maria delle Grazie, Este =

Basilica church in Este

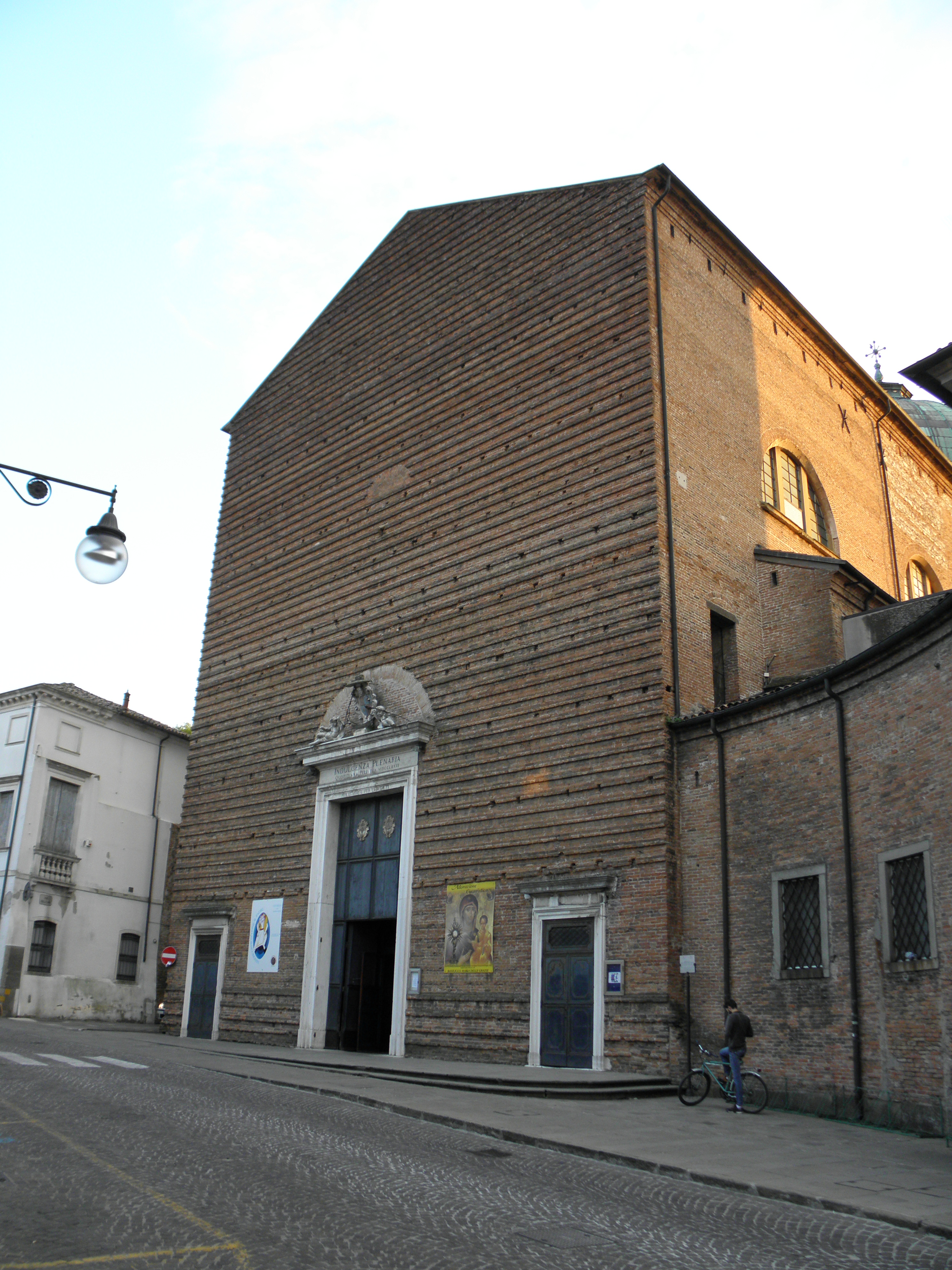
Este, the basilica of Santa Maria delle Grazie.

Santa Maria delle Grazie is a Baroque-style, Roman Catholic basilica church located in the town of Este in the province of Padova, region of Veneto, Italy. Within the shrine is the image of the Blessed Virgin Mary of Graces, transferred from the ransack of Constantinople and ultimately crowned by Pope Pius VII in 10 December 1822.

== History ==
A church at the site, but smaller and in a different orientation, was erected in 1478, patronized by the last will of Prince Taddeo d'Este. The original church was located outside of the city walls in association with a Dominican convent. The church was rebuilt starting in 1717 with a single nave. In 1736, demolition of the old church began, and led to discovery of a fresco depicting the Pietà, which became a source of veneration. In 1745 most of the interiors were complete. In 1770, however the monastic order was suppressed in Este, and the Dominicans expelled. By 1776, the church had been reconsecrated as parish church for the frazione of San Martino. Further work, including the construction of the octagonal dome was pursued, and completed in 1889 using designs by the architect Giuseppe Riccoboni. In 1924, the church was conceded the title of a basilica by Pope Pius IX.

== Interiors ==
The new main altar was inaugurated by Girolamo Bortignon in 1950. In 1965, a fire devastated the Sacristy.

The interior houses in the apse, the main altarpiece depicting a Byzantine (Cretan) icon of the Madonna of the Graces, given to Este by the Venice. A finely carved wooden choir stall is arrayed below in U-shape. The church also contains an altarpiece depicting the Martyrdom of St Sebastian (circa 1700) by Alberto Calvelli. Along the nave are niches with 15 stone sculptures of saints, prophets and allegories, sculpted by Pietro Zandomeneghi (1806–1866) and Valentino Panciera, called Besarel. The statues are meant to have presaged or relate to the Life of Virgin: they include Amos, Daniel David, Debora, Anne, Elisabeth, John the Baptist, Simeon, Maria Soror Moysis, Castitas (chastity), Costantia (constance), Oratio (prayer), and Humilitas (humility).

The nave has eight slightly indented side altars and two chapels. The altarpieces of St Dominic and St Thomas Acquinas were painted by Antonio Zanchi. The altar of the Holiest Sacrament is made of polychrome marble. The center of the nave has a late-19th century fresco depicting the Coronation of the Virgin by Giovanni Battista Baldi. Baldi also painted the four evangelists in the spandrels of the dome, as well as the medallions along the nave depicting the doctors of the church (Leo the Great, Ambrosius, Augustine, and Jerome) and four allegories of virtues (justice, strength, temperance, and prudence). A canvas depicting the Consignment of the icon to the Dominicans (circa 1700) was painted by Nicola Grassi.
