= Pietro Zandomeneghi =

Italian sculptor

Pietro Zandomeneghi (1806-1886) was an Italian sculptor, active in the Veneto.

== Biography ==
He was born and died in Venice. Along with his father Luigi Zandomeneghi, they completed the funeral monument to Titian located in Santa Maria dei Frari in Venice. He also completed works for Santa Maria delle Grazie in Este. He became a professor of sculpture at the Royal Academy of Fine Arts in Venice. He created some of the statues and reliefs in San Maurizio. His son Federico Zandomeneghi was a prominent impressionist painter.

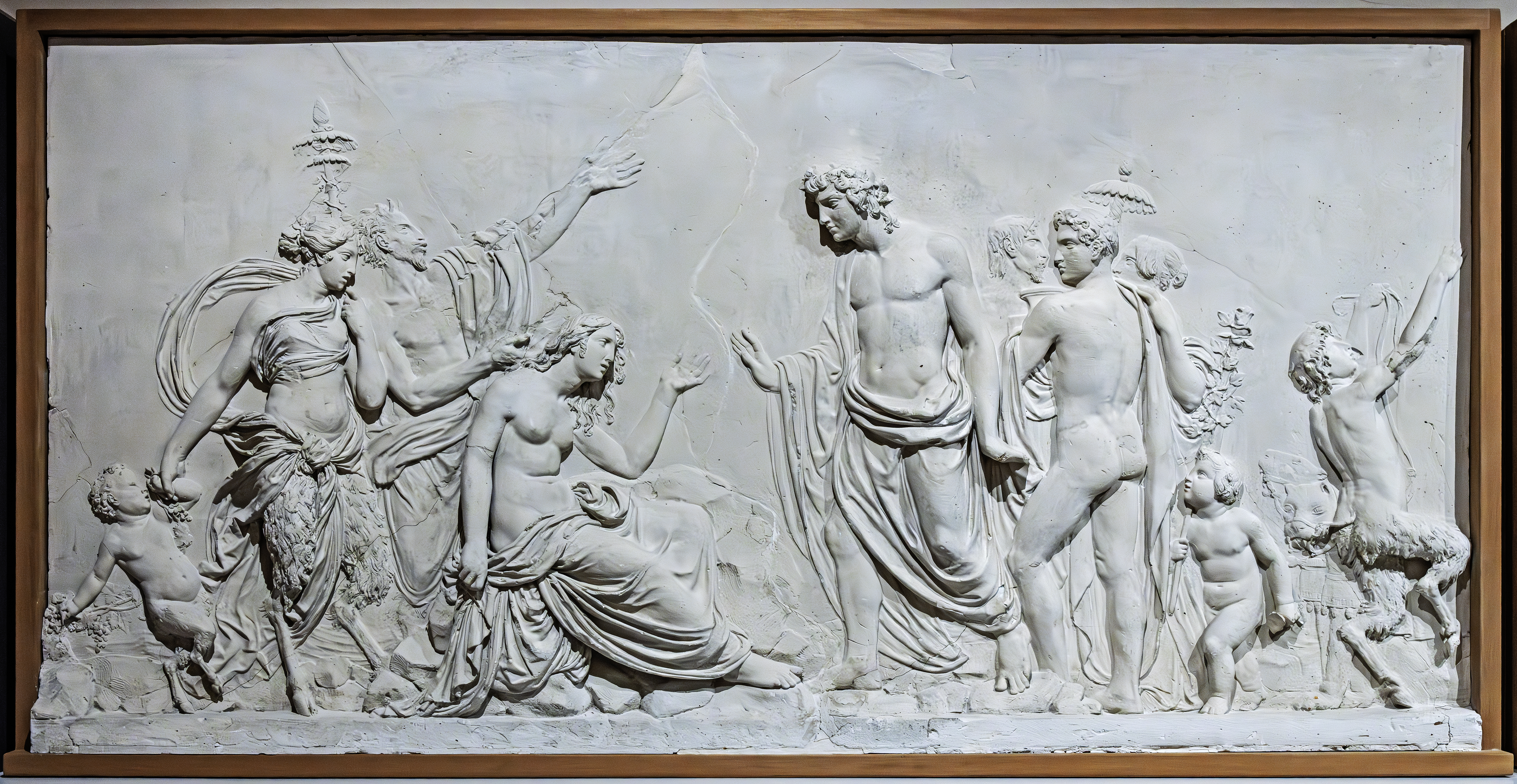
Bacchus comforting Ariadne - Museo civico di Santa Caterina Treviso

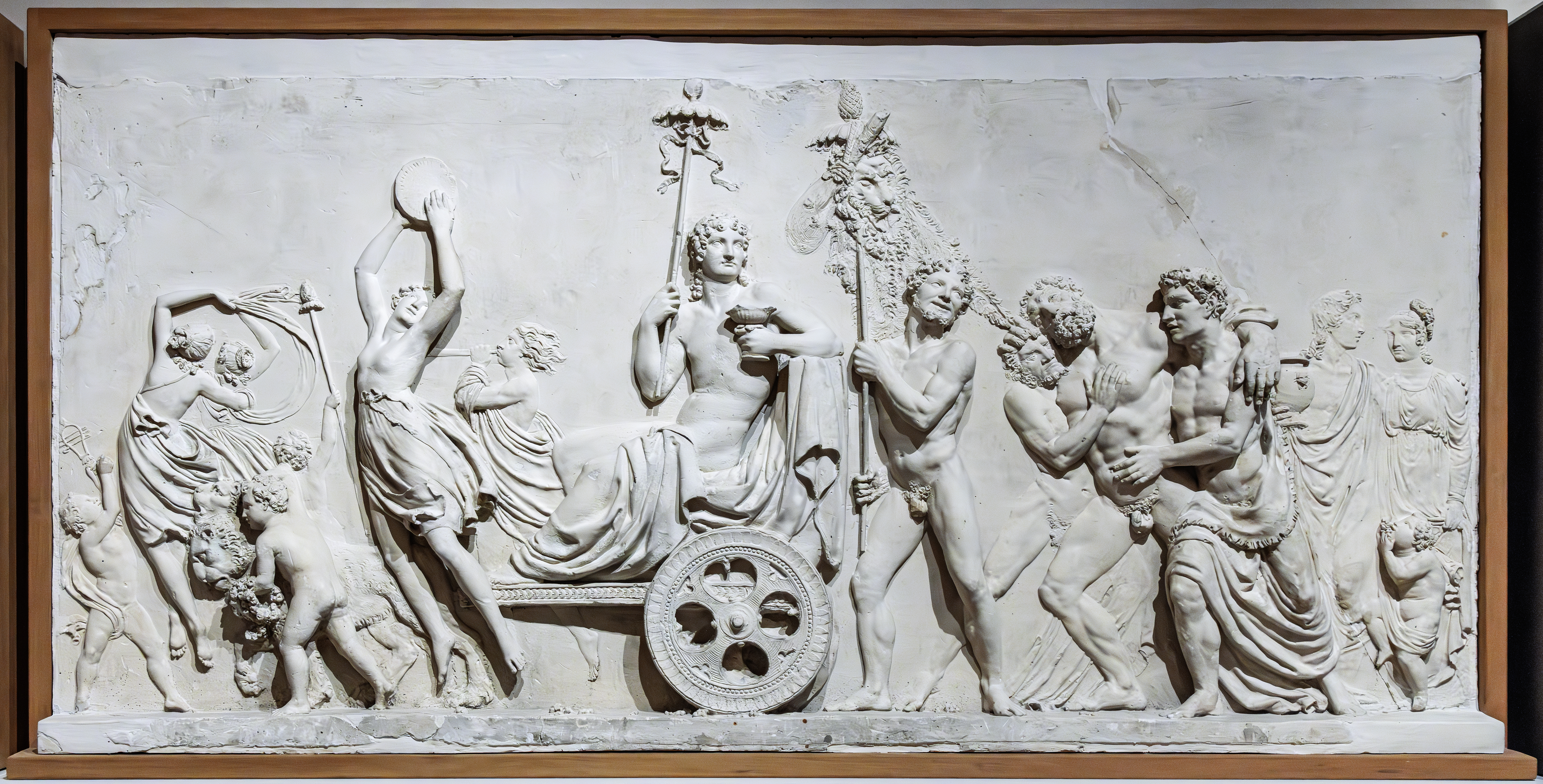
Triumph of Bacchus - Museo civico di Santa Caterina Treviso
