= Treviso Cathedral =

Church in Treviso, Veneto, Italy

Coordinates: 45°39′59″N 12°14′34″E

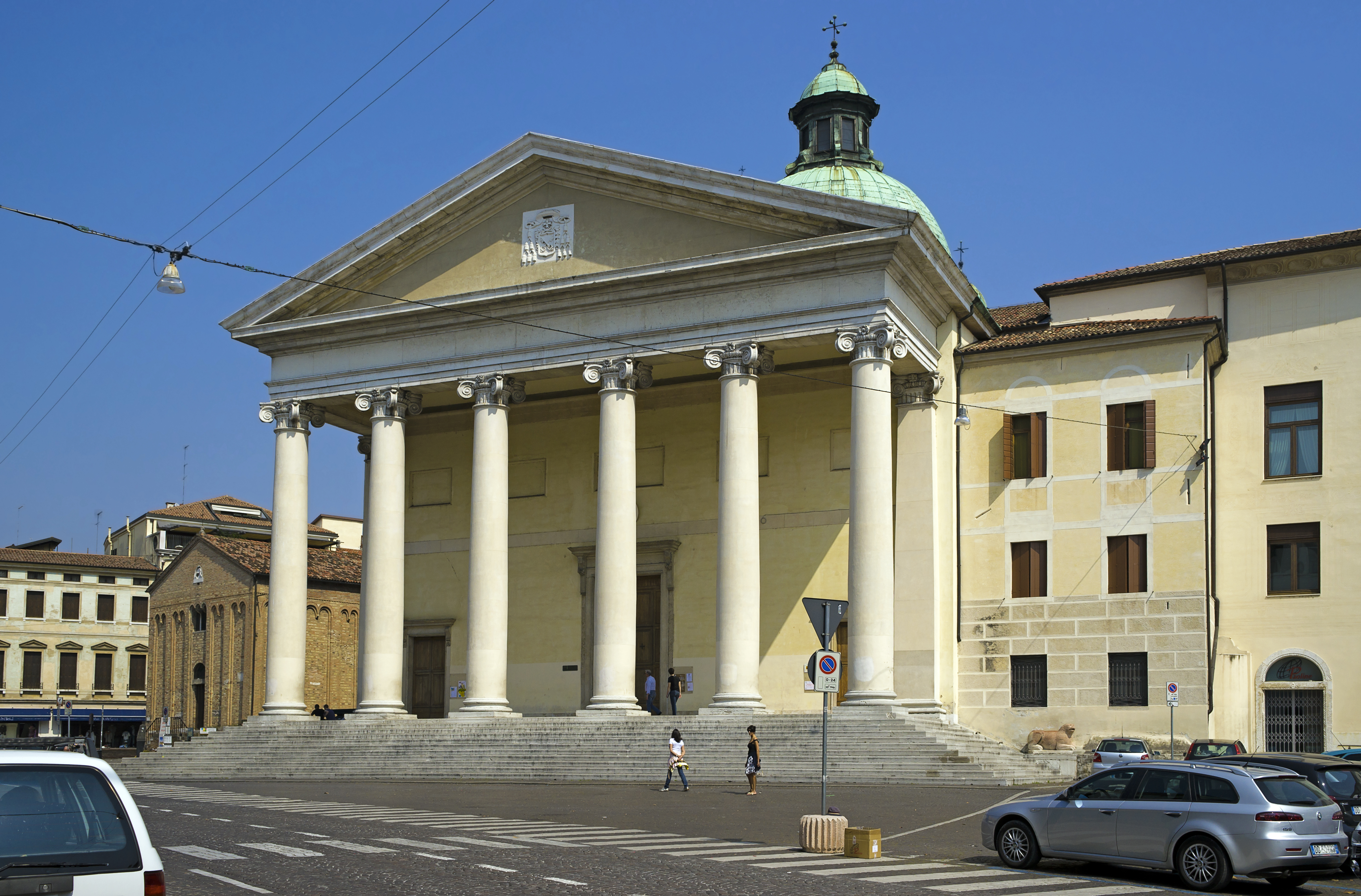
Treviso Cathedral west front

Treviso Cathedral (Italian: Duomo di Treviso, Cattedrale di San Pietro Apostolo) is a Roman Catholic cathedral in Treviso, Veneto, northern Italy, dedicated to Saint Peter. It is the seat of the bishop of Treviso.

== History ==
The church originates from the 6th century and stands in an area where during the Ancient Roman period there were a temple, a theatre and possibly some baths. In the 11th-12th centuries, the church was remodelled in Romanesque style. In 1768 it was demolished and rebuilt in Neoclassical style, only the crypt remaining from the previous edifice. The current façade dates from 1836. Treviso Cathedral was involved in the Good Friday bombing of 7 April 1944, having part of its library damaged by fire.

== Description ==
Sights in the interior include the Malchiostro Chapel, designed by Tullio and Antonio Lombardo, which was frescoed by Il Pordenone and which houses the Malchiostro Annunciation by Titian and two canvases by Paris Bordone. The large fresco of Immaculate Conception in the apse is by Antonio Beni.

The church has an unfinished bell tower, whose construction, according to the tradition, was stopped by the Venetian government to prevent it from becoming taller than the campanile of St. Mark's Basilica. The crypt houses the tombs of the city's bishops.

The Diocesan Museum is home to a fresco by Tommaso da Modena.

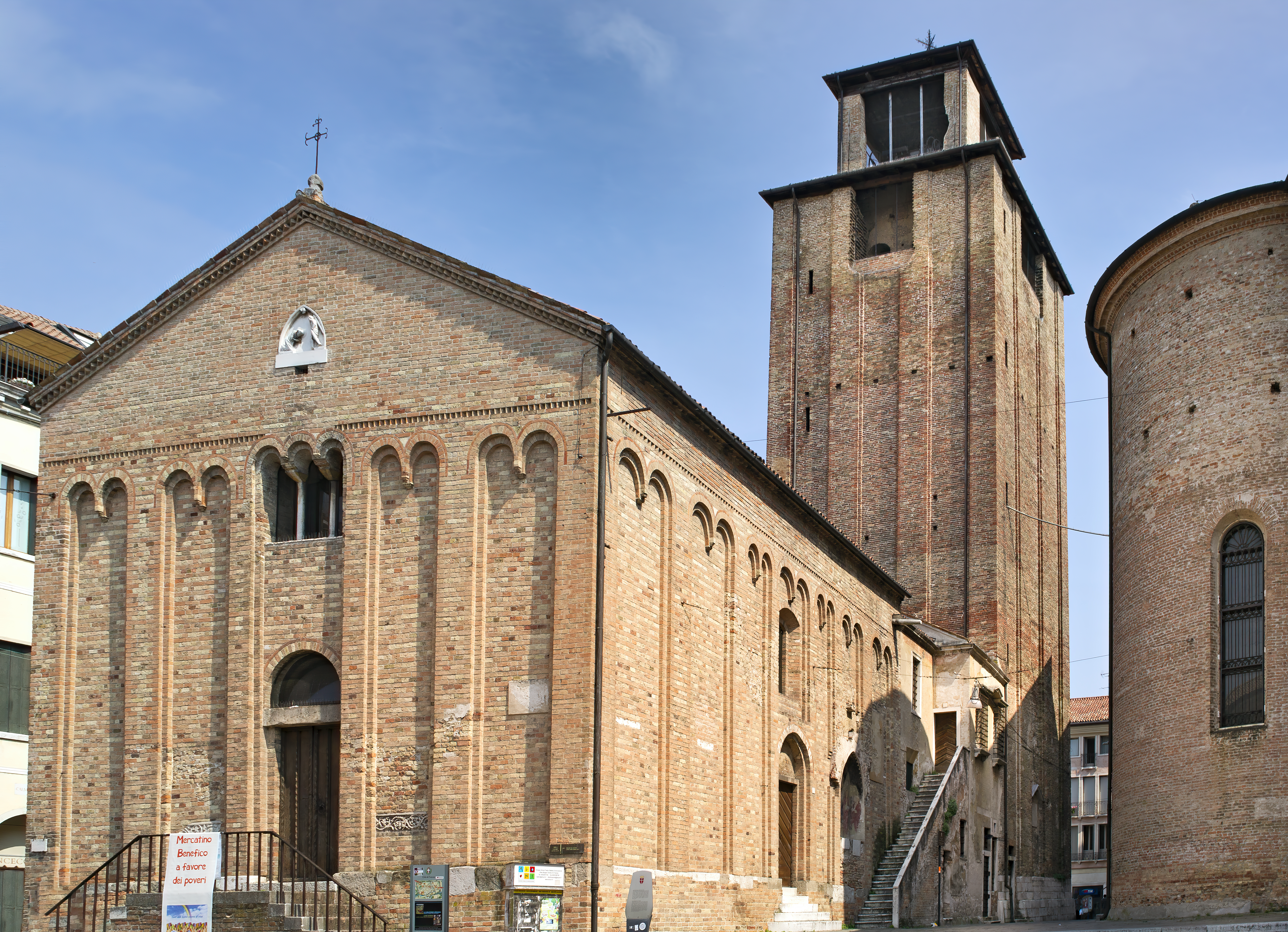
Il campanile from Piazza Duomo

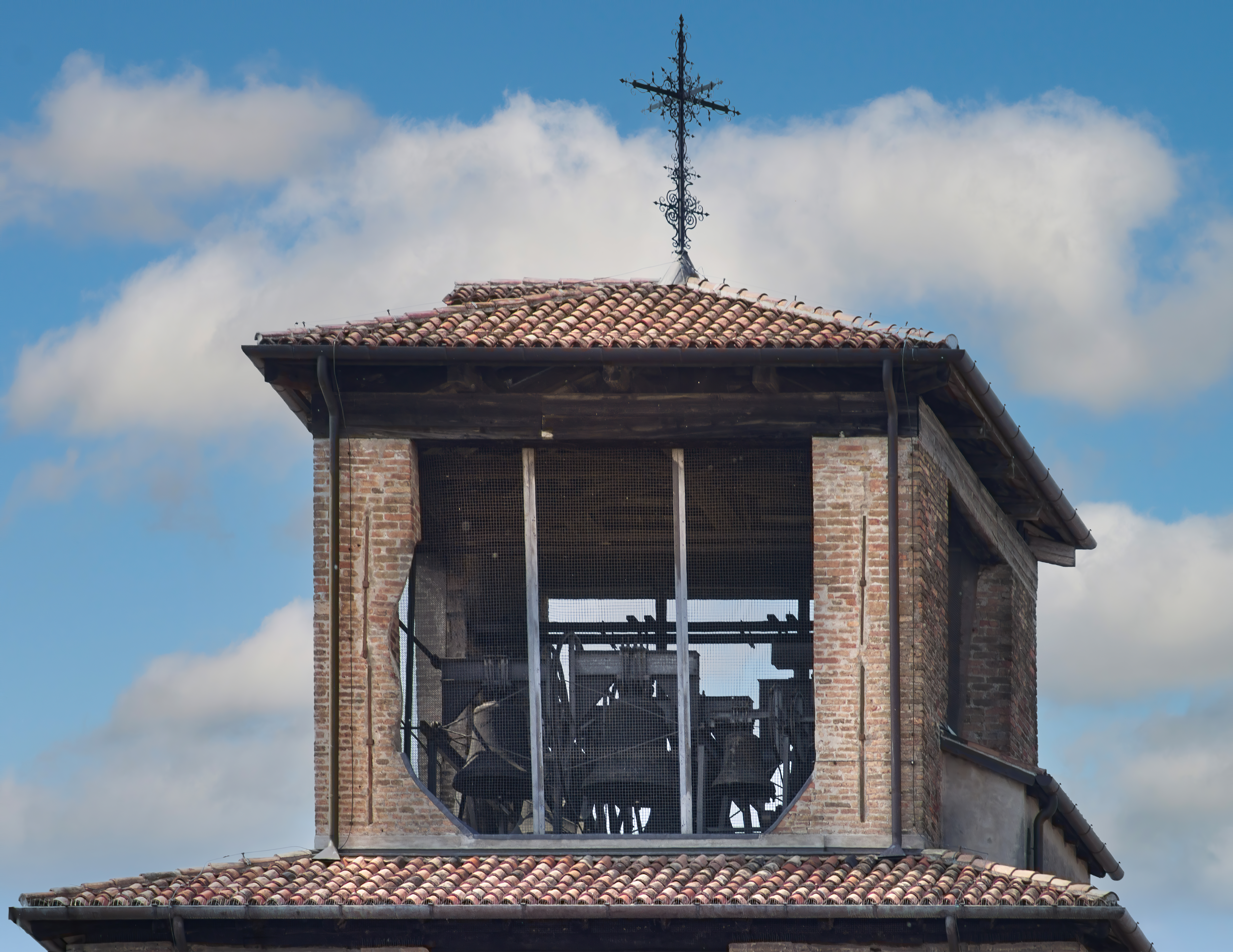
Top of the campanile with the bells from Calmaggiore
