= Dino Martens =

Italian painter

Dino Martens (1894–1970) was an Italian painter and designer particularly noted for his glass work. He trained at the Accademia di Belle Arti. He had his paintings exhibited at the Venice Biennale (1924–1930) and after his return from Italy's African wars became the artistic director of Aureliano Toso (the famous Venetian glass works). He remained there for many years producing many noted works using traditional Venetian techniques but producing some original effects, "daring" asymmetric shapes - the designs often being marked by their obvious difficulty of execution.
