= Agostino Panozzi =

Italian painter

Agostino Panozzi (10 August 1810 – 6 March 1839) was an Italian painter, active in Vicenza.

He was born in Arcugnano in the province of Vicenza. He studied at the Academy of Fine Arts of Venice from 1828 to 1831.

A Communion (or Coronation) of Saint Louis at the Pinacoteca Civica of Bologna is attributed to the painter. He also painted a Death of Archimedes (1832), also in the museums of Vicenza.

He painted an altarpiece depicting the Miracle of the Mule (1834) for the Cathedral of Cologna Veneta Returning to Vicenza in 1835, he aspired to establish a school to teach figure painting. He painted some canvases, now lost, for Monte Berico. He developed paralysis of the legs, and despite, or due to surgery, died in Padua.
