= Bartolomeo Bezzi =

Italian painter (1851–1923)

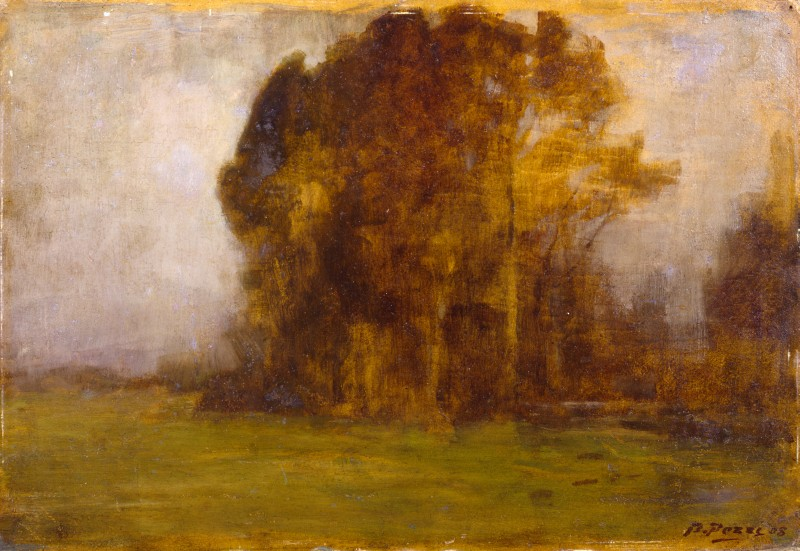
Autunno, 1908 (Fondazione Cariplo)

Bartolomeo Bezzi (1851–1923) was an Italian painter.

== Biography ==
Bartolomeo Bezzi was born in Fucine di Ossana (Trento), then in the Austrian Empire. Having lost his father as a child, Bezzi lived with an uncle and enrolled at the Brera Academy in Milan at the age of twenty, exhibiting for the first time in 1878. He won the Fumagalli Prize in 1882 and the following year he took part in the Esposizione di Belle Arti di Roma, receiving general acclaim for his landscape painting. Dividing his time between Milan, Verona and his native region of Val di Sole, he experimented with life painting. In 1890 he moved to Venice and came into contact with the lively intellectual environment in the city: in 1895 he was one of the promoters of the 1st Venice Biennale and was a member of the organising committee at some of the later exhibitions. He also received recognition abroad, winning the gold medal at the International Exhibition in Munich in 1892 and the silver medal at the Exposition Universelle in Paris in 1900. During the second decade of the 20th century he lived first in Rome and then in Verona, finally settling in Clès, in Val di Non, where he died in 1923.

== Other projects ==
Media related to Bartolomeo Bezzi at Wikimedia Commons
