= Alessandro Milesi (painter) =

Italian painter

Alessandro Milesi (Venice, 1856–1945) was an Italian painter, mainly depicting genre subjects.

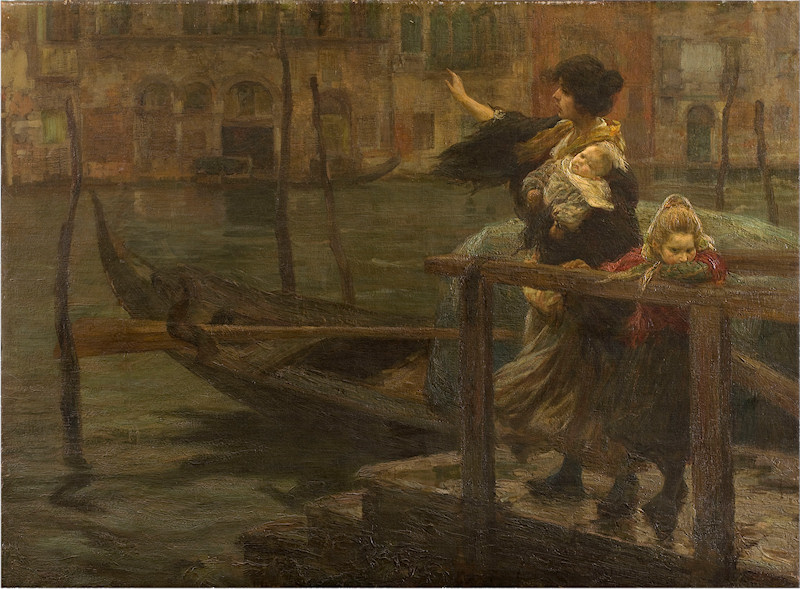
La traversata or La partenza del marinaio (Fondazione Cariplo)

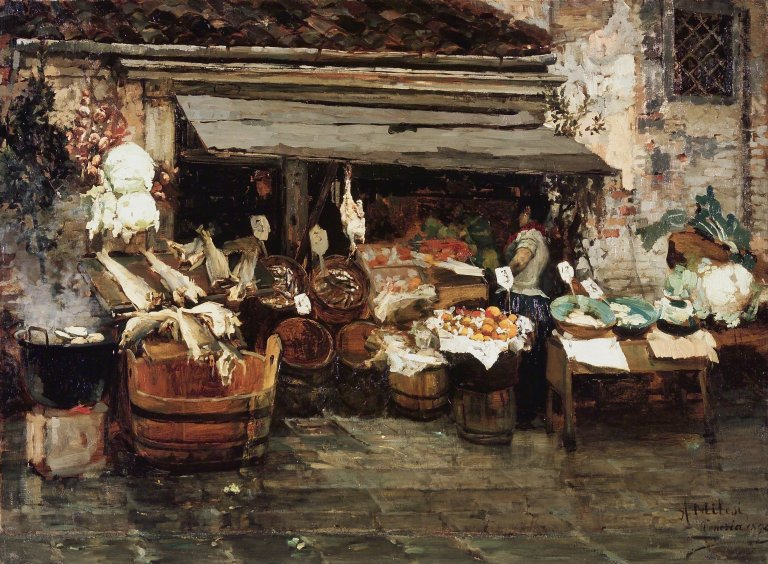
Market Scene, Brooklyn Museum

== Biography ==
Milesi was a pupil of Napoleone Nani at the Venice Academy of Fine Arts from 1869 to 1874, when he followed his master to Verona, returning to his hometown in 1876.

The work he presented at the national exhibitions held in Milan (1881) and Venice (1887) established his reputation as a painter of everyday Venetian life, carrying on the tradition of Giacomo Favretto but also influenced by the new artistic approach of Ettore Tito and Cesare Laurenti. The winner of a gold medal at the Boston International Exhibition of 1890, he took part in the Milan Triennale and in all the editions of the Venice Biennale from 1895 to 1935, with a solo show in 1912 and an anthological exhibition in 1935. He achieved success with portraits of the Venetian middle classes at the beginning of the new century and continued to paint writers, musicians and actors also in the following decades.

== Other projects ==
Media related to Alessandro Milesi at Wikimedia Commons
