= Luigi Nono (painter) =

Italian painter

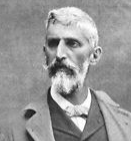
- Nono in 1899
- Born: 8 December 1850; Fusina, near Venice, Austrian Empire
- Died: 17 October 1918 (aged 67); Venice, Italy

Luigi Nono (8 December 1850 – 17 October 1918) was an Italian painter, known primarily for his genre scenes depicting life among the poor.

== Biography ==
A young Nono entered the Accademia of Venice, then under the leadership of Pompeo Marino Molmenti. But by at the age of twenty years, he went to Polcenigo in the Friulian countryside, and he began to refine his style of landscape paintings, including Sull' Avemaria, Le sorgenti del Gorgazzo, Ritorno dai campi, and Verso sera. He later returned to painting genre subjects of everyday life, and these paintings would prove to be his most influential. If his contemporary, Giacomo Favretto depicted the sunny and humorous events of contemporary Venice, Nono delved into the painful and poignant scenes. For example, one of his paintings, Abbandonati exhibited at the 5th Exposizione of Venice, depicts a homeless mother and child sleeping under a church portal. He also paints the funeral of a child.

In 1880 at Turin, he exhibited: La caccia ai grilli and The Fruitseller; in 1881 at Milan, he displayed a genre painting, L'Ave Maria, and others titled: La povera madre; a half-figure Autunno; and October Morning. To the 1881 Mostra of Venice, he sent: Le amanti and Refugium peccatorum, considered one of his masterworks. To the 1883 Promotrice, he sent Sottomarino. To Rome also in 1883, he redisplayed Refugium peccatorum. Also in 1883, he exhibited La Morte del Pulcino in Milan. In 1887 at Venice, he exhibited: I Recini da festa and Ruth. In 1885, he painted Il Bimbo Malato. In 1888 at Bologna, he displayed: A Venezia.

Luigi's brother was a sculptor. Luigi Nono's grandson of the same name (Venice, January 29, 1924 – Venice, August 5, 1990) was an Italian avant-garde music composer. In 2012, an exhibit of his work took place in Milan.

== Selected paintings ==
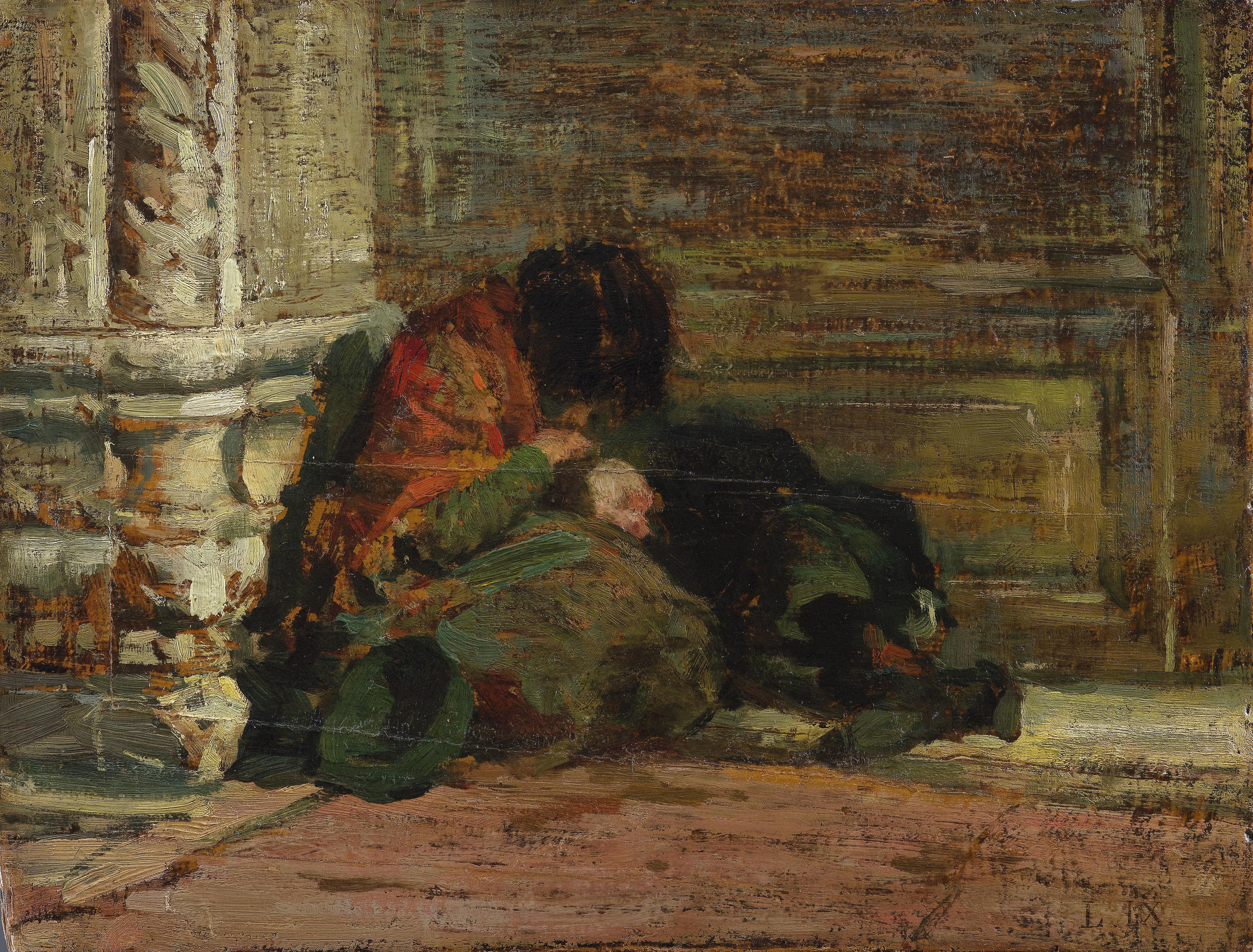
Study for Abbandonati, 1875.

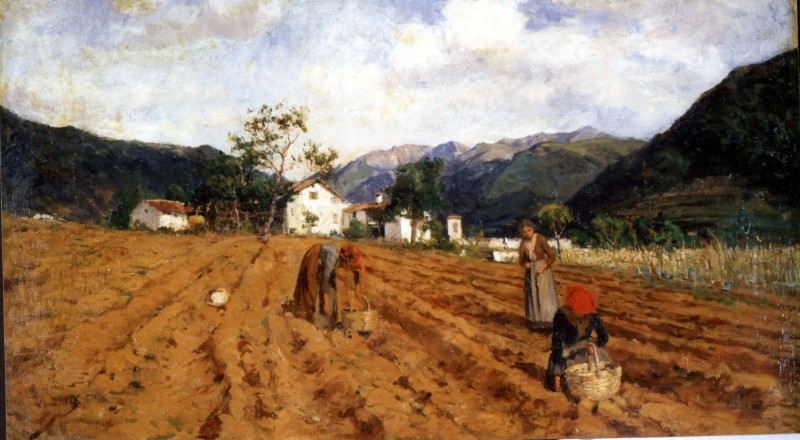
Potato harvesting. (1877)

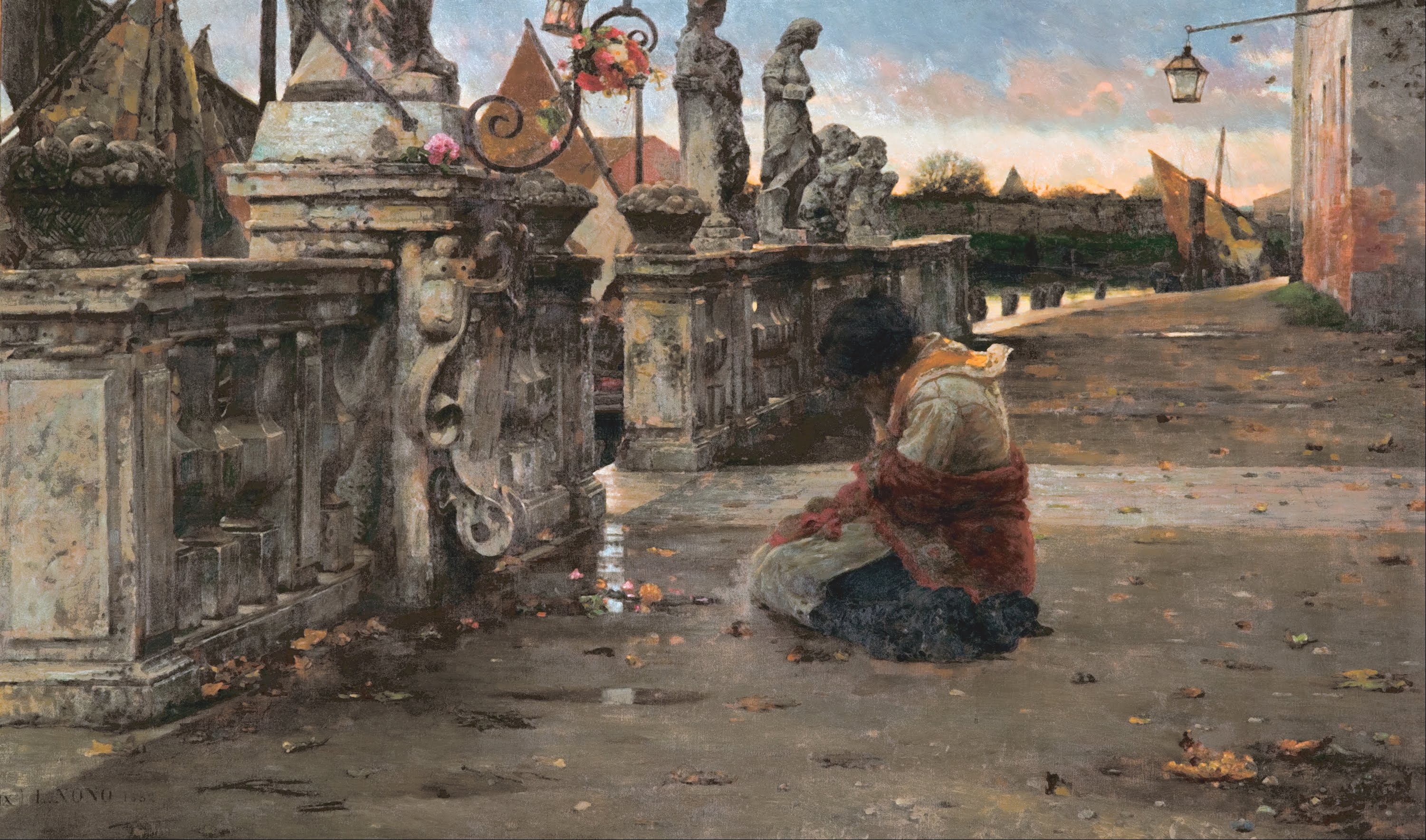
Refugium peccatorum.
