= Giacomo Favretto =

Italian painter

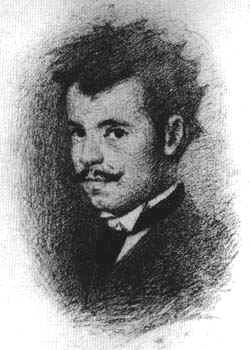
Self-Portrait (1874)

Giacomo Favretto (August 11, 1849 – June 12, 1887) was an Italian painter, mainly depicting genre subjects in Venice, his native city.

== Biography ==
Favretto was born in Venice into a family of humble origin. His father was a carpenter and he spent many years in the family workshop. Favretto enrolled at the Academy of Fine Arts in 1864, where he trained under Pompeo Marino Molmenti. He was said to have been discovered in a stationer's shop cutting out silhouettes to make a living. By age 30, he had lost sight in one eye.

He presented work in 1873 at the Fine Arts Exposition of the Brera Academy in Milan, where his genre painting attracted the attention of Camillo Boito. Having travelled to Paris with Guglielmo Ciardi in 1878 to take part in the Universal Exhibition, he once again presented work at the Brera in 1880, winning the Prince Umberto Prize.

The same year also saw his participation in the Esposizione Nazionale di Belle Arti in Turin with works featuring everyday life in Venice and scenes in 18th-century costume. Favretto died in Venice in 1887. Confirmation of his success came in 1887 at the Esposizione Nazionale Artistica in Venice, where the works presented included Liston Odierno (Promenade Today in Venice) (1884, Galleria Nazionale d’Arte Moderna, Rome).

== Selected paintings ==
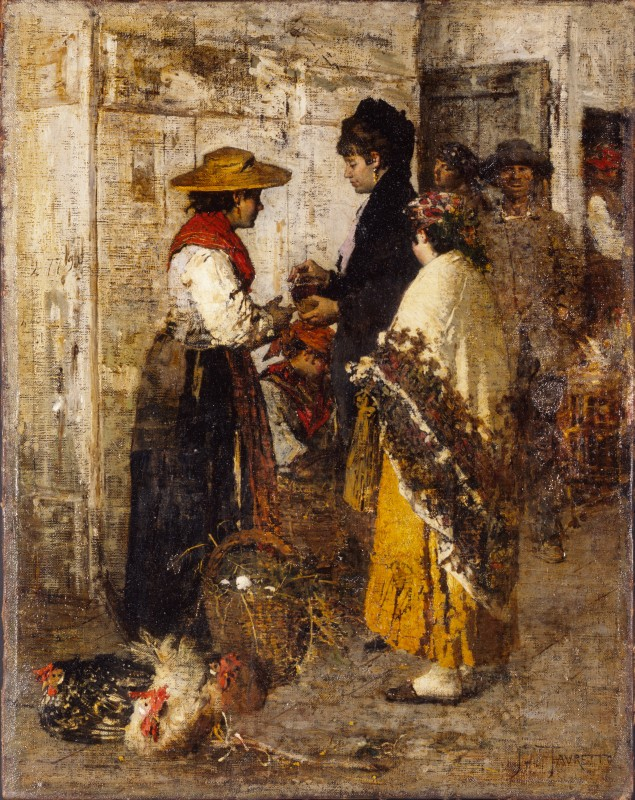
The Poultry Seller

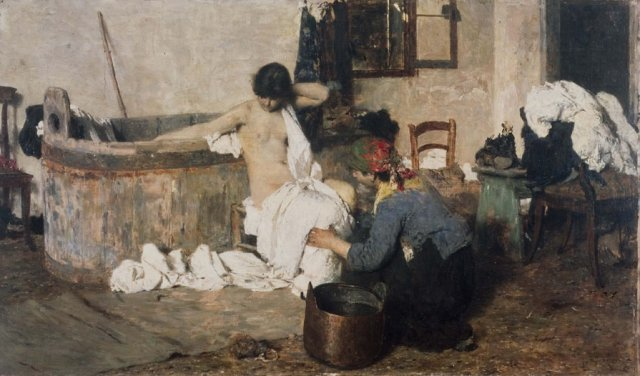
After the Bath

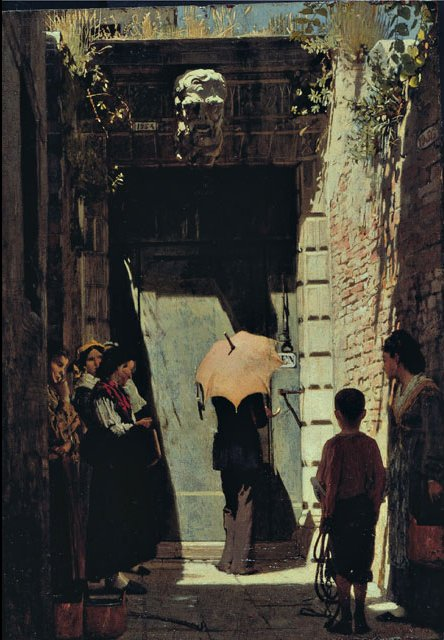
Entrance to a Noble Home

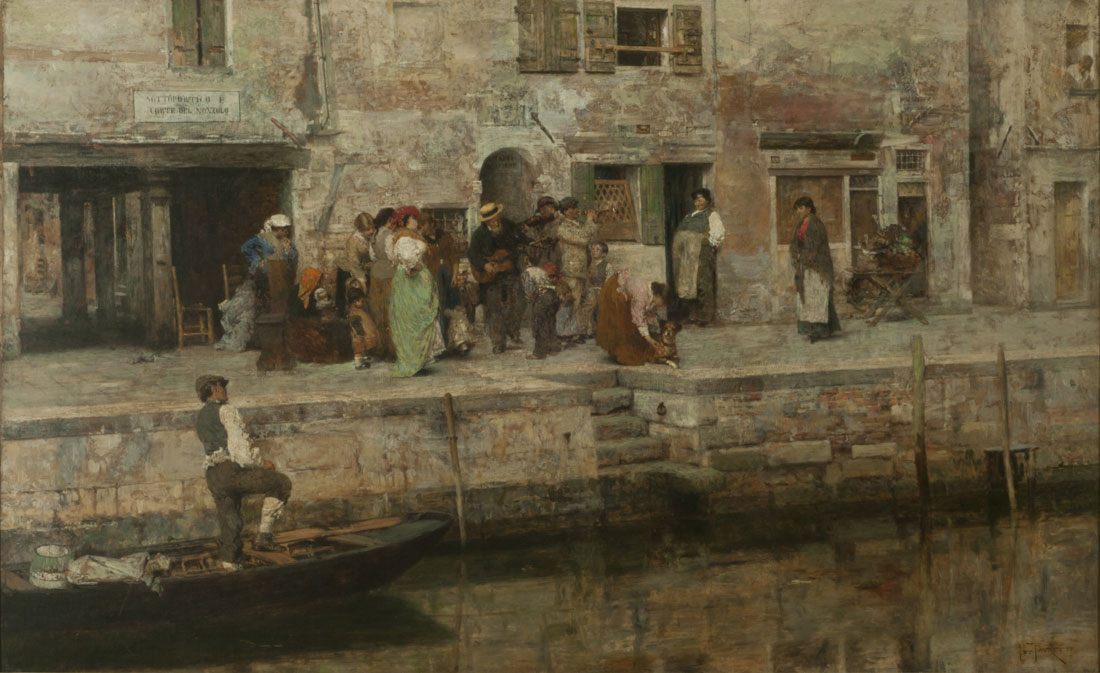
Traveling Musicians

== Other projects ==
Media related to Giacomo Favretto at Wikimedia Commons
