= Accademia di Belle Arti di Venezia =

Public academy of art in Venice, Italy

Venice Academy of Fine Arts
- Accademia di belle arti di Venezia
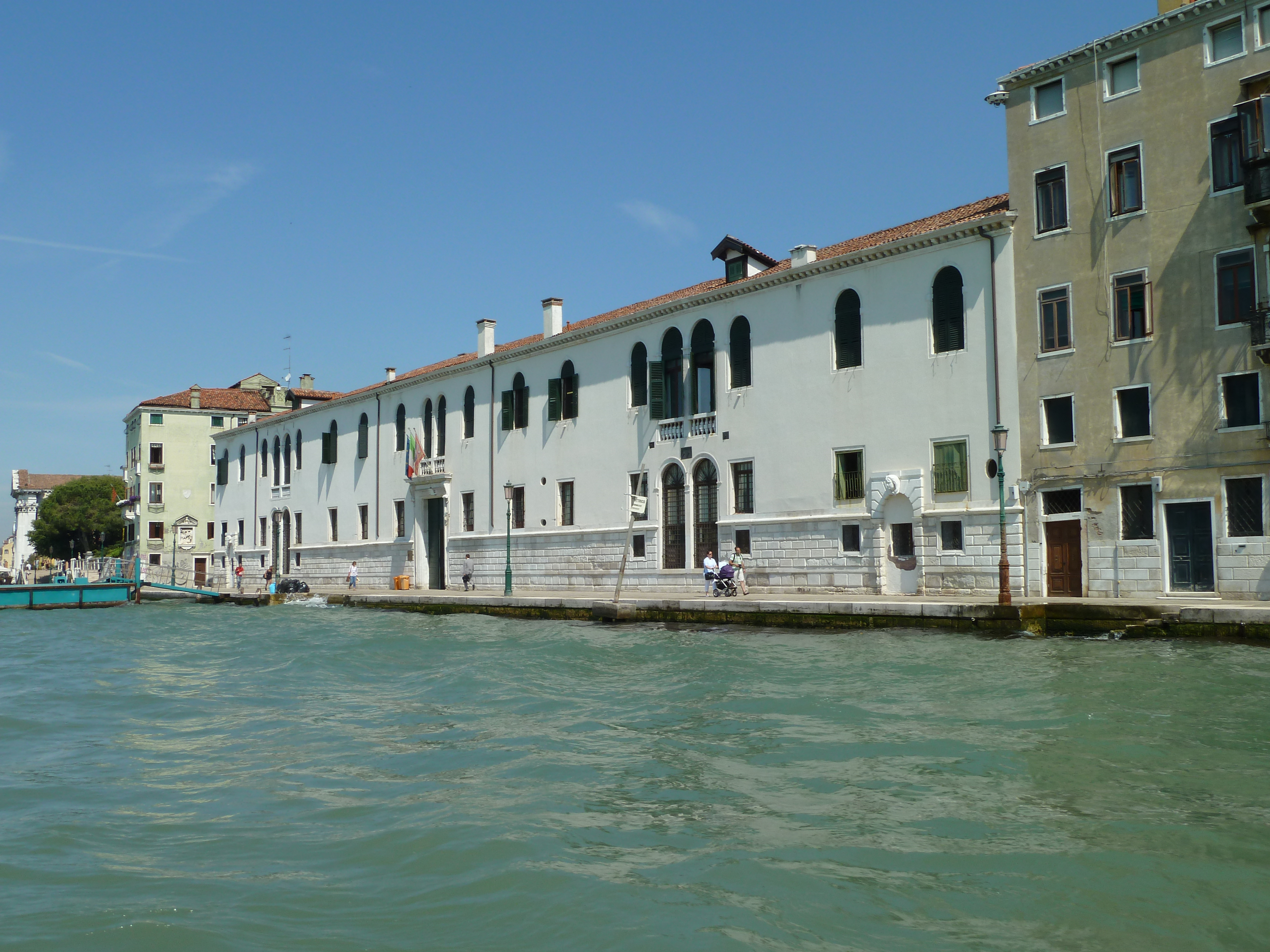
- Façade of the former Ospedale degli Incurabili, now home of the academy
- Motto: et veteres revocavit artes
- Type: academy of art
- Established: 24 September 1750
- President: Luigino Rossi
- Location: Venice, Italy; 45.4287°N 12.3305°E
- Website: accademiavenezia.it

The Accademia di Belle Arti di Venezia (English: Academy of Fine Arts of Venice) is a public tertiary academy of art in Venice, Italy.

== History ==
The Accademia di Belle Arti di Venezia was founded on 24 September 1750; the statute dates from 1756. The first director was Giovanni Battista Piazzetta; Gianbattista Tiepolo became the first president after his return from Würzburg. The academy was at first housed in a room on the upper floor of the Fonteghetto della Farina, a flour warehouse and market on the Grand Canal, close to Piazza San Marco. The space was insufficient, and students and teachers had to contend with the noise and dust of the market, which also occupied the first floor of the building.

Antonio Canova studied at the academy in the 1770s.

In 1807, the academy was re-founded by Napoleonic decree. The name was changed from Veneta Academia di Pittura, Scultura e Architettura to Accademia Reale di Belle Arti, "royal academy of fine arts", and the academy was moved to premises in the Palladian complex of the Scuola della Carità.

In 1879, the Accademia di Belle Arti and the Gallerie dell'Accademia became administratively separate, but continued to share the same buildings until 2004, when the art school moved to the present site, the former Ospedale degli Incurabili. Like other state art academies in Italy, it became an autonomous degree-awarding institution under law no. 508 dated 21 December 1999, and falls under the Ministero dell'Istruzione, dell'Universita e della Ricerca, the Italian ministry of education and research.

== Notable alumni ==
- Antonio Canova (1757–1822), sculptor
- Matteo Pertsch (1769–1834), architect
- Agostino Panozzi (1810–1839), painter
- Luigi Boscolo (1823-1906), engraver
- Giovanni Squarcina (1825–1921), painter
- Umberto Boccioni (1882–1916), painter and sculptor
- Amedeo Modigliani (1884–1920), painter and sculptor
- Mario Prayer (1887–1959), painter
- Brenno Del Giudice (1888–1957), rower and architect
- Dino Martens (1894–1970), Italian painter and designer particularly noted for his glass work
- Ariel Agemian (1904–1963), painter
- Carlo Scarpa (1906–1978), architect
- Giuseppe Santomaso (1907–1990), painter, also served as faculty here (1957-1975)
- Giulio Turcato (1912–1995), painter
- Tancredi Parmeggiani (it) (1927–1964), painter
- Sergio Franzoi (1929–2022), painter
