= Venetian Renaissance architecture =

Architecture in Venice

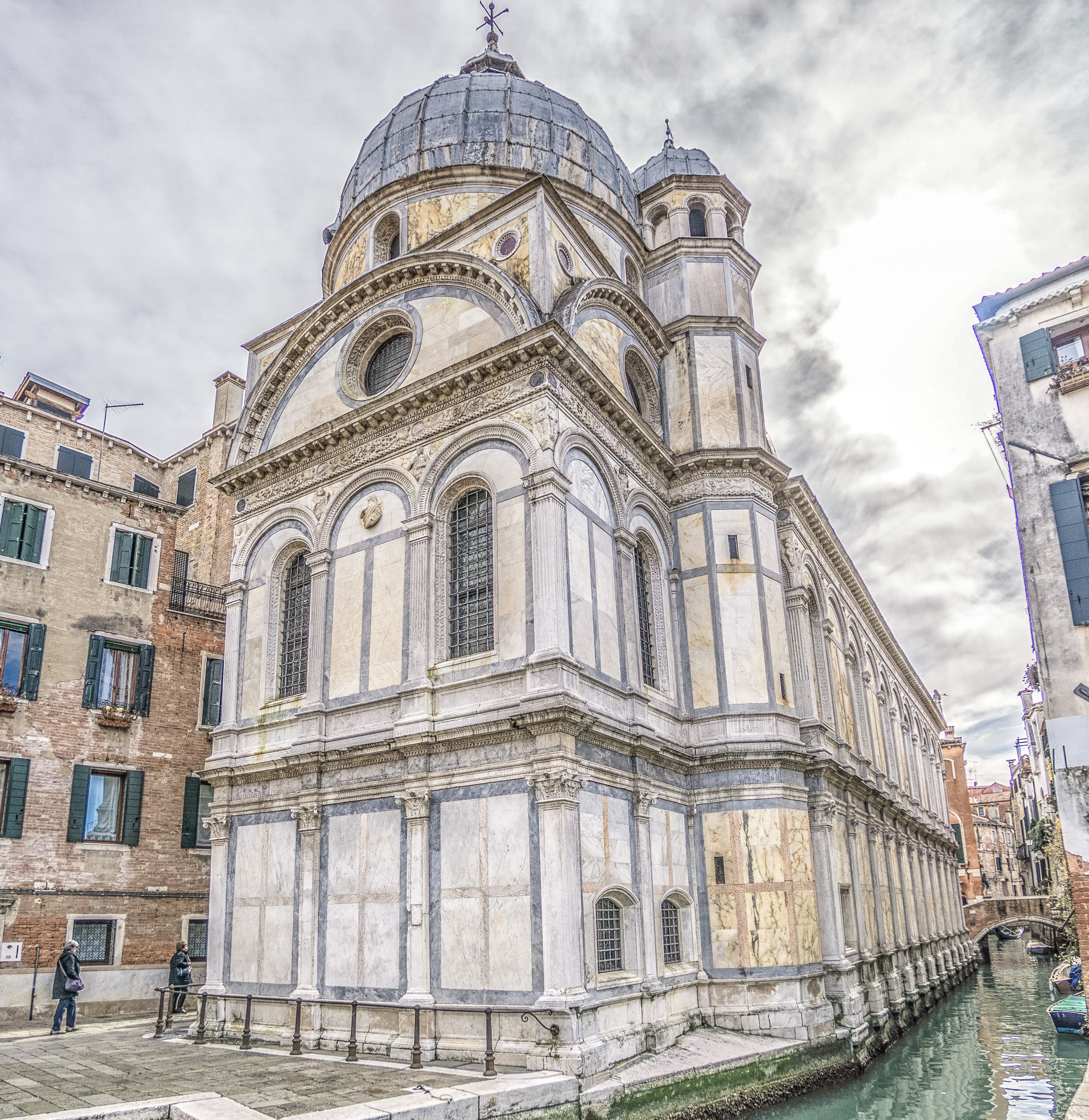
Santa Maria dei Miracoli, 1480s, by Pietro Lombardo, who was mainly Venice's leading sculptor.

Venetian Renaissance architecture began rather later than in Florence, not really before the 1480s, and throughout the period mostly relied on architects imported from elsewhere in Italy. The city was very rich during the period, and prone to fires, so there was a large amount of building going on most of the time, and at least the facades of Venetian buildings were often particularly luxuriantly ornamented.

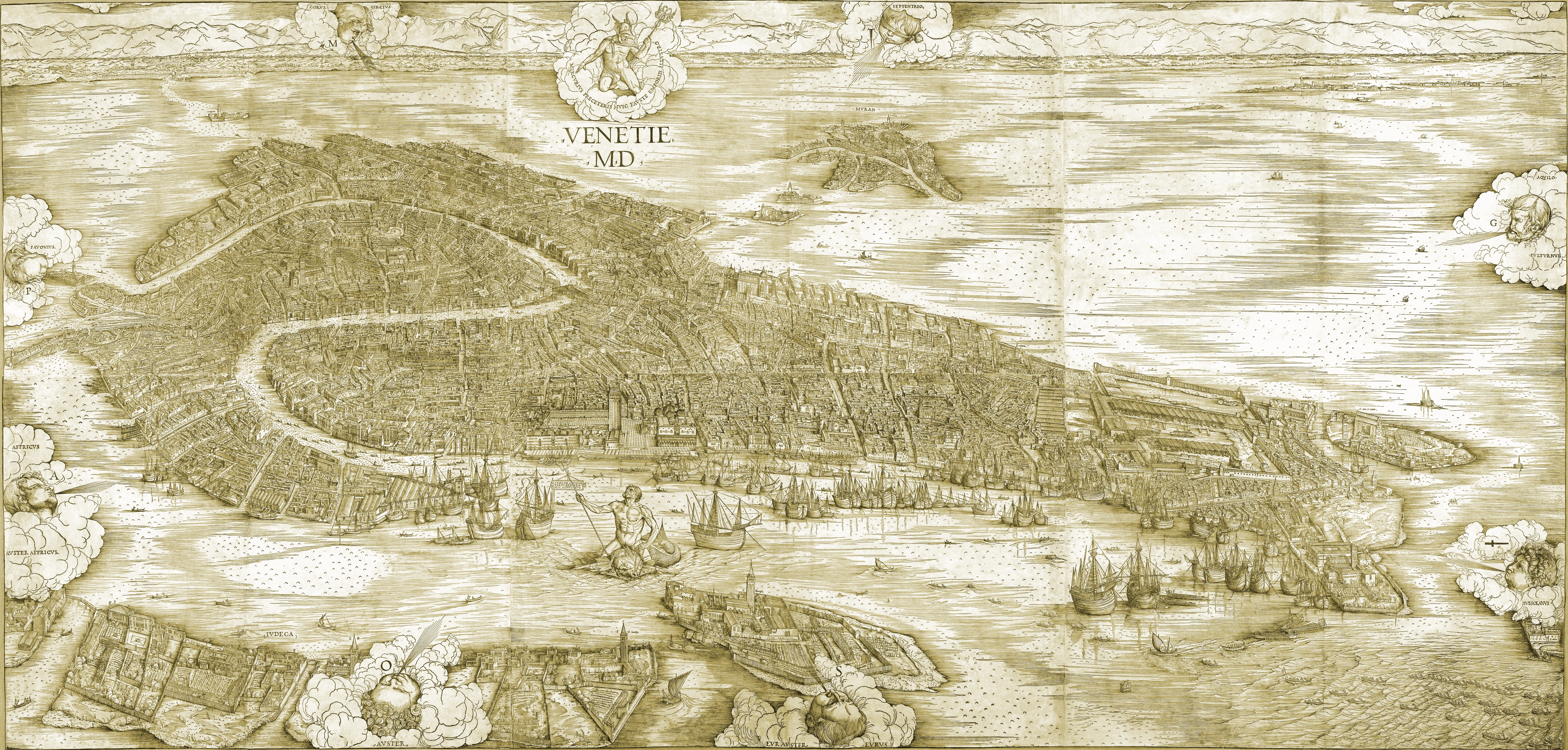
The huge woodcut View of Venice by Jacopo de' Barbari, 1500, was considered the definitive work depicting the city for much of the century.

Compared to the Renaissance architecture of other Italian cities, there was a degree of conservatism, especially in retaining the overall form of buildings, which in the city were usually replacements on a confined site, and in windows, where arched or round tops, sometimes with a classicized version of the tracery of Venetian Gothic architecture, remained far more heavily used than in other cities. The Doge's Palace was much rebuilt after fires, but mostly behind the Gothic facades.

The Venetian elite had a collective belief in the importance of architecture in bolstering confidence in the Republic, and a Senate resolution in 1535 noted that it was "the most beautiful and illustrious city which at present exists in the world". At the same time, overt competition between patrician families was discouraged, in favour of "harmonious equality", which applied to buildings as to other areas, and novelty for its own sake, or to recapture the glories of antiquity, was regarded with suspicion. Though visitors admired the rich ensembles, Venetian architecture did not have much influence beyond the republic's own possessions before Andrea Palladio (1508–1580), whose style of Palladian architecture became hugely influential some time after his death, not least in the English-speaking world.

== Venetian building ==
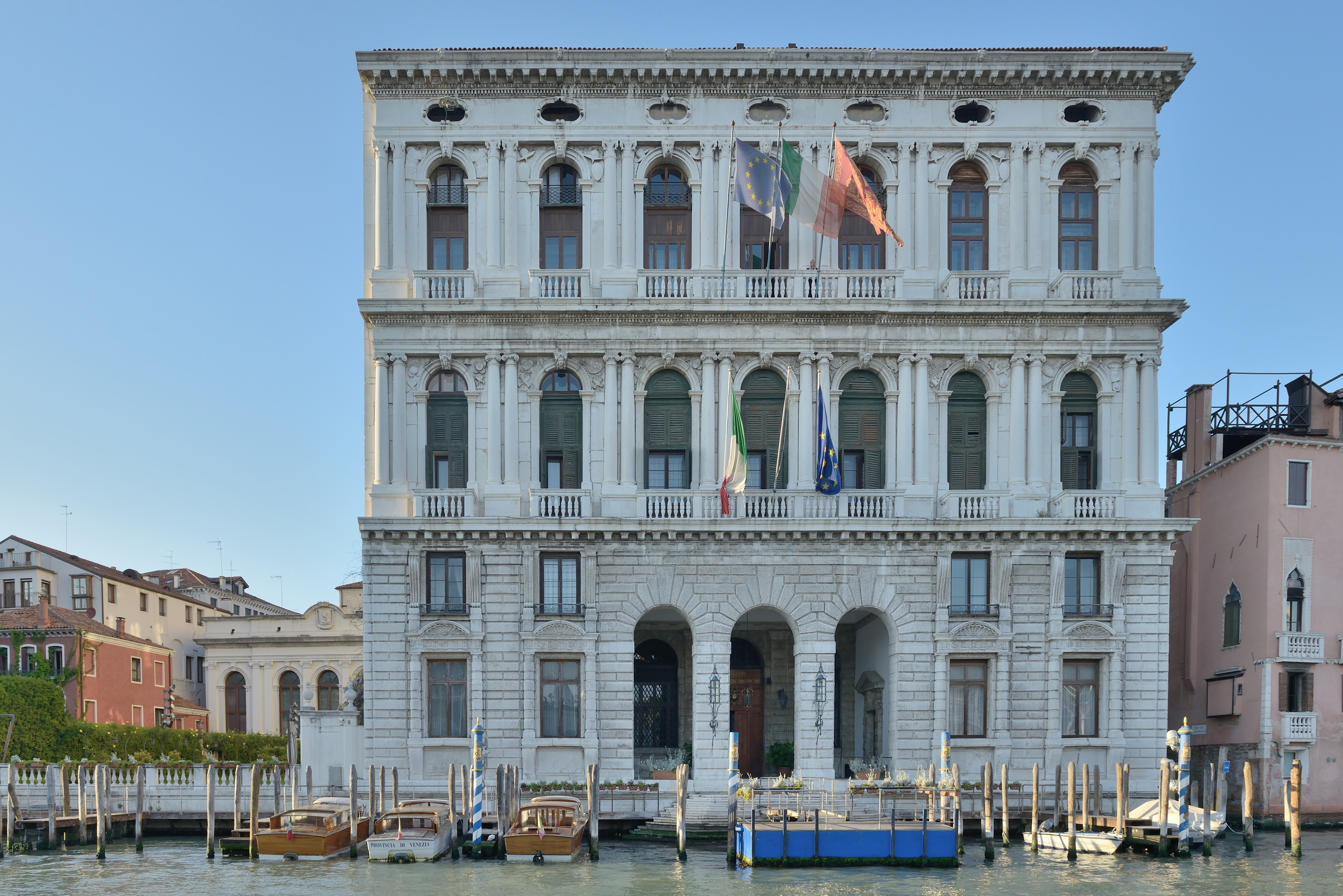
Jacopo Sansovino's Palazzo Corner della Ca' Grande, replacing a building burnt down in 1532. Compare the much simpler sides.

Venice is built on alluvial mud, and most buildings in the city were (and mostly still are) supported by large numbers of timber piles driven into the mud. Above a stone platform sitting on these, the normal building material is brick, although the Renaissance facades were usually faced with Istrian stone, a fine limestone that is not strictly a marble, although it is often so called. This came by sea from quarries in Istria in the terraferma, now in Croatia. It also had the advantage that it withstood the salt in the coastal air, and floods, much better than marble. Other stones with different colours were often used for contrast, especially a red stone from Verona. Marmorino or cocciopesto stuccos, made from grinding limestone, brick and terracotta fragments, was the typical finish for interior walls, and sometimes exteriors.

Flat ceilings supported with timber beams were preferred to vaults, which might crack as the building settled on the pile foundations. Typically two layers of floorboards, placed at right angles to each other, sat on the joists. Different types of wood were used for different purposes, and by the Renaissance period the nearer mainland forests were running short, and the cost of timber had risen considerably. The distinctive and very large Venetian chimney-pots, with a terracotta covered top like an inverted cone, were designed to stop dangerous sparks from escaping and starting fires.

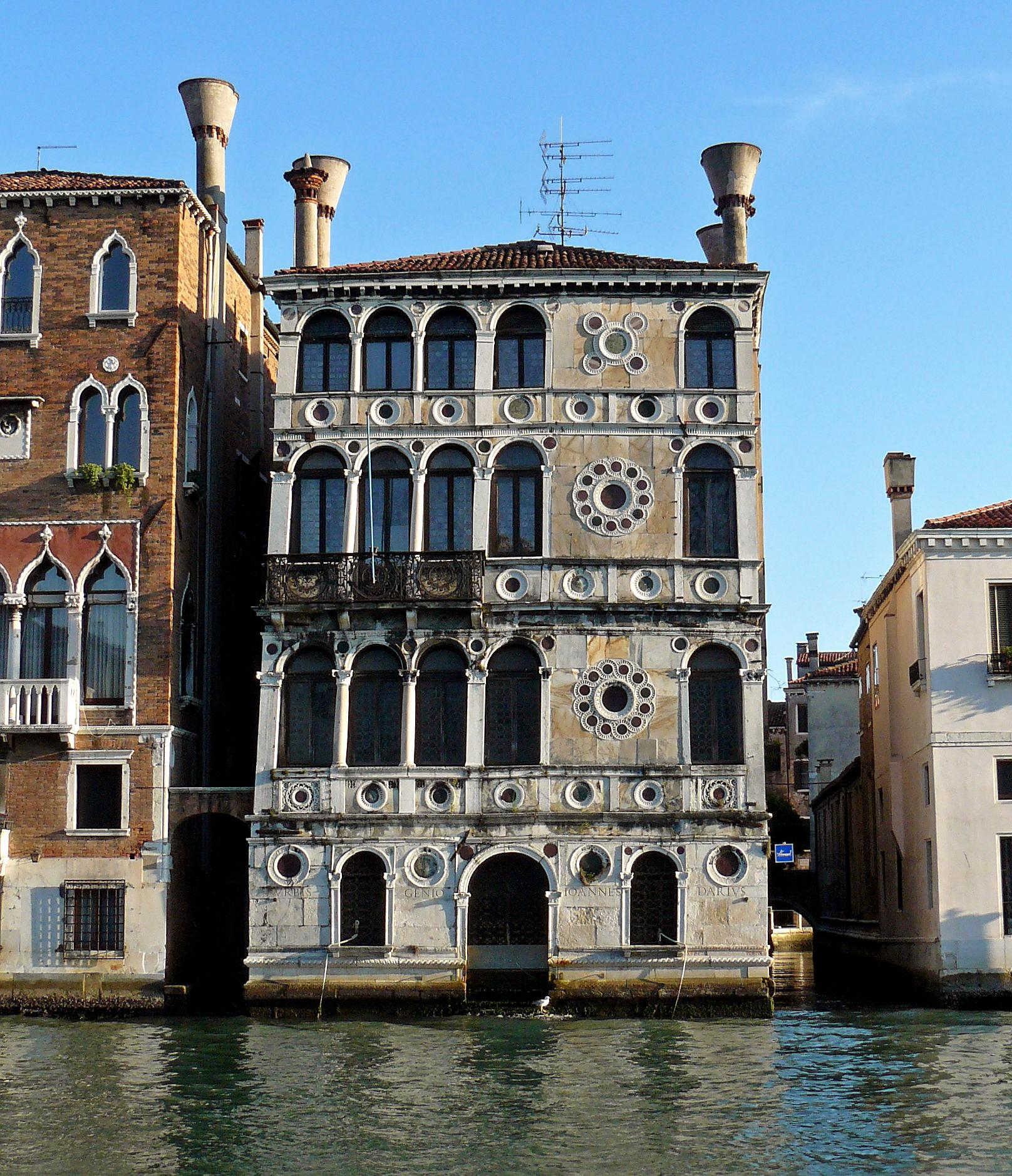
Palazzo Dario, 1480s, with characteristic Venetian chimney-pots

The main city was already very largely built up, with buildings tightly packed in the centre; this is shown clearly by Jacopo de' Barbari's huge woodcut View of Venice with an elevated view of the city in 1500. Most of the grander Renaissance buildings were replacements, which had to fit in to the existing site boundaries. Because buildings were tightly packed, Venice was even more prone than other Italian city centres to fires, creating the need for many of the new buildings. In particular the Rialto district was almost destroyed in 1514, and the Doge's Palace had bad fires in 1483, 1547, and 1577, although the Gothic exterior facades survived. The almost permanently busy building activity in Venice meant that skilled workers abounded. Despite this, finishing major buildings often took ten to twenty years, or more.

Unlike the palaces or houses of wealthy families in other cities in Italy, defence was not a major concern for Venetian palaces, which in any cases often had "moats" on some sides. The crowded city centre encouraged building high by the standards of the period, and the main access for light was often from the front facade, which therefore typically has more and larger windows than palaces elsewhere. It was not uncommon to add extra storeys to old buildings. The population of the city, which had reached six figures by about 1300, reached its all-time peak at about 190,000 before a terrible plague in 1575–77 killed about a third of the people (including the aged Titian and his son).

== Early buildings ==
The Venice Arsenal's main gate, the Porta Magna, was built in the late 1450s and was one of the first works of Venetian Renaissance architecture. It was based on the Roman Arch of the Sergii, a triumphal arch in Pula in Istria, now in Croatia but then Venetian territory. From around the same date, the Arco Foscari, an elaborate canopy or triumphal arch for the ceremonial entrance in the courtyard of the Doge's Palace, is classical in its lower levels, but becomes a forest of Gothic pinnacles by the top.

== Architects and their principal buildings ==
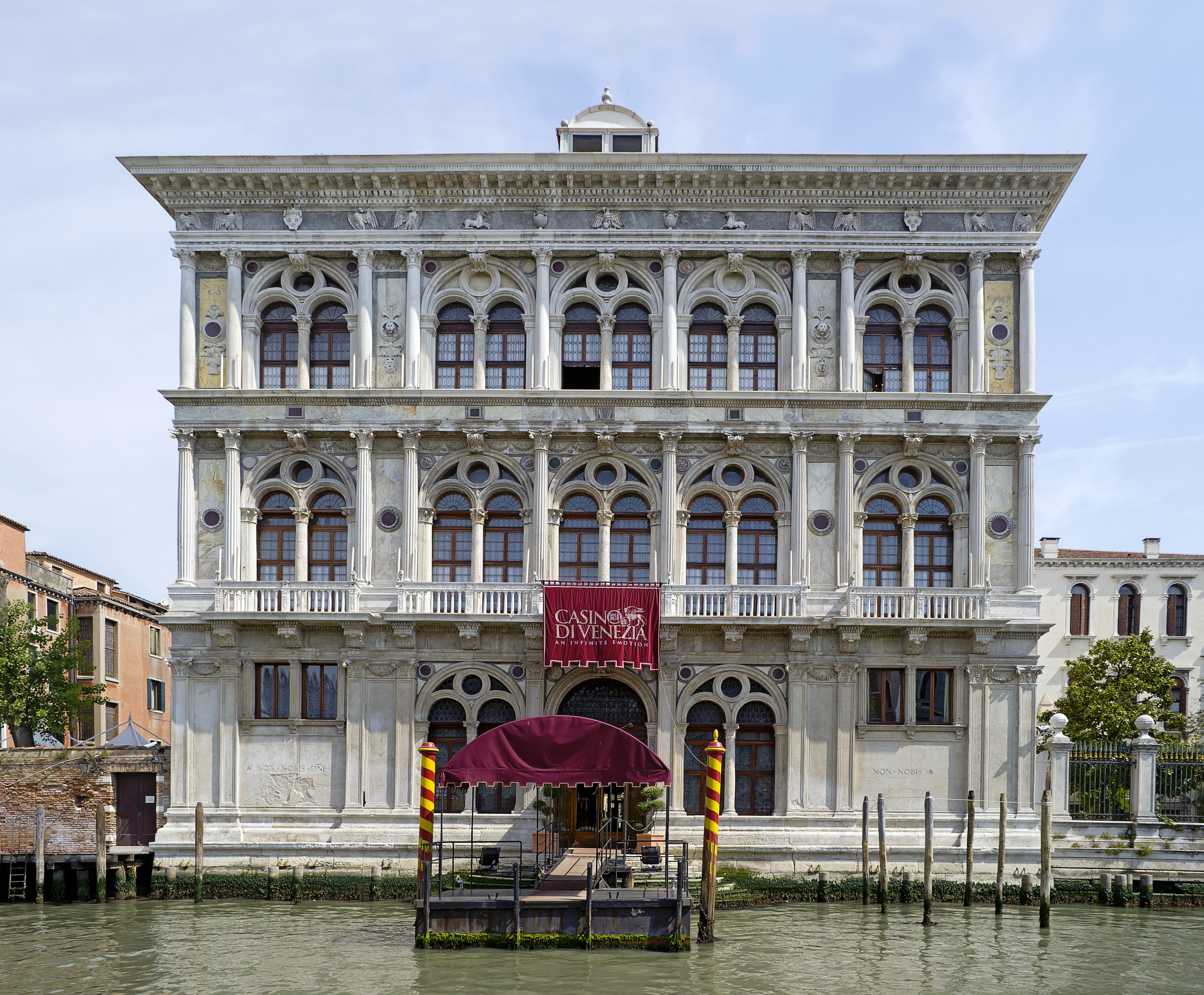
Mauro Codussi, Ca' Vendramin Calergi, from 1481

Most Venetian architects were not natives of the city, or even of the terraferma or mainland territories of the Republic of Venice, but the large budgets available in Venice tempted architects from all over north and central Italy. Artists mainly known as sculptors also worked as architects. Apart from Sansovino (discussed below), the most important of these are the Lombardo family, especially Pietro Lombardo (1435–1515), and then the Mannerist Alessandro Vittoria (1525–1608). The history of Venetian architecture is complicated because of the habit of appointing what might today be called a "managing architect", a protomaestro or proto, to report to supervising committees, whose name often survives in archives. The extent to which they were actually responsible for the design varies greatly.

Mauro Codussi (1440–1504) from Lombardy was one of the first architects to work in a Renaissance style in Venice, with his son Domenico assisting him and carrying on his practice after his death. His works in public buildings include the upper storeys of San Zaccaria, Venice, San Giovanni Grisostomo (begun 1497), Santa Maria Formosa (begun 1492), and the Procuratie Vecchie on the Piazza San Marco. He probably designed St Mark's Clocktower (from 1495), and worked with sculptors to rebuild the Scuola Grande di San Marco after a fire in 1485. A fire in 1483 destroyed the east wing of the Doge's Palace, and Codussi won the competition to replace it, producing completely different designs for the facades facing into the courtyard and the outside. His palazzi include Ca' Vendramin Calergi (begun 1481) and Palazzo Zorzi Galeoni. His work respects and alludes to many elements of the Venetian Gothic, and harmonizes well with it.

Other architects active in the early Renaissance period include Giorgio Spavento (active from 1489 or before, d. 1509), and Antonio Abbondi, often known as Scarpagnino (died 1549), who was active from at least 1505. San Sebastiano, Venice, begun 1506, is an early work. Both of these had many government commissions.

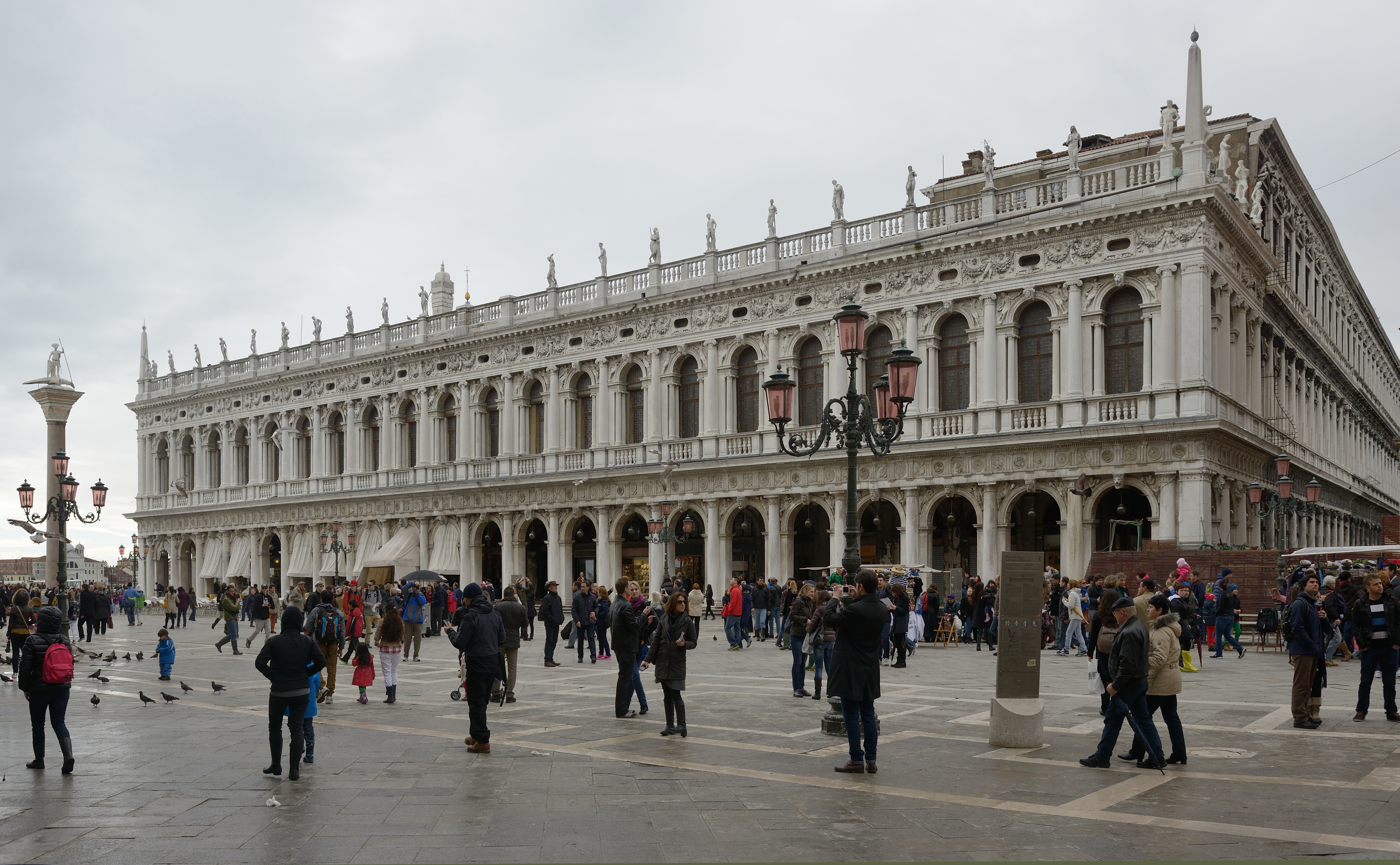
Jacopo Sansovino, Biblioteca Marciana, begun 1537

Jacopo Sansovino (1486–1570), also an important sculptor, was a Florentine with a successful career in Florence and then Rome. He fled to Venice after the catastrophic Sack of Rome in 1527 and in 1529 was appointed chief architect and superintendent of properties (Protomaestro or Proto) to the Procurators of San Marco. According to Manfredo Tafuri, his first project in Venice, Palazzo Gritti, was never built as his plans, though brilliant, were considered too full of exhibitionist novelties; he had failed to grasp the ideology of the sober and restrained magnificence required by Venetian patricians. However, his plan to stabilize the domes of San Marco, which had long given trouble, by wrapping iron bands around them, "made his reputation". Before long he found a style that satisfied Venetian patrons and was "definitive for the entire subsequent history of Venetian architecture". He created the appearance of much of the area around the Piazza San Marco beyond Basilica of San Marco itself, designing the Biblioteca Marciana (1537 onwards) and mint or "Zecca" on the Piazzetta di San Marco. His palazzi include Palazzo Corner della Ca' Grande (1532 onwards) and Palazzo Dolfin Manin from 1536.

The Biblioteca Marciana is considered his "undoubted masterpiece", and a key work in Venetian Renaissance architecture. Palladio, who saw it being built, called it "probably the richest ever built from the days of ancients up to now", and it has been described by Frederick Hartt as "surely one of the most satisfying structures in Italian architectural history". It has an extremely prominent site, with the long facade facing the Doge's Palace across the Piazzetta di San Marco, and the shorter sides facing the lagoon and the Piazza San Marco.

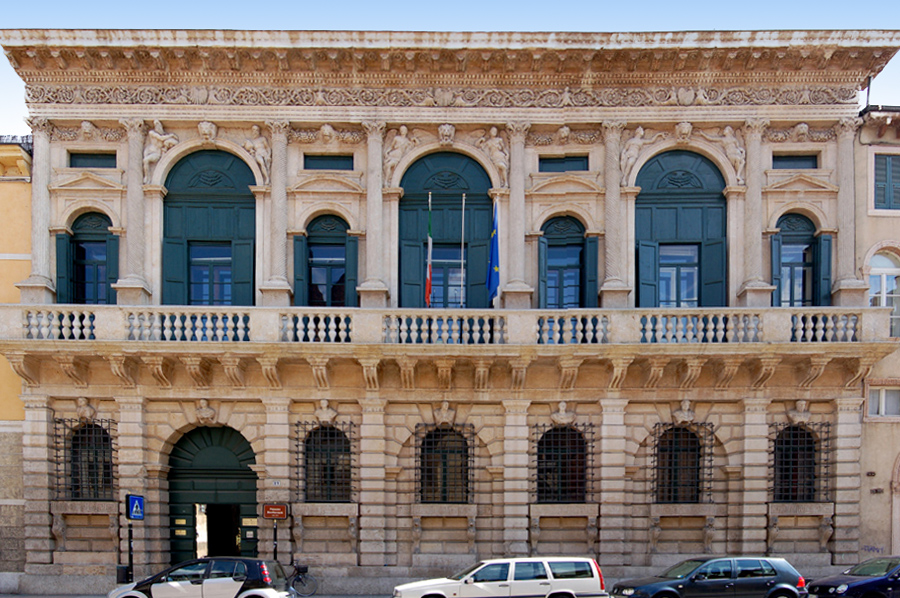
Michele Sanmicheli, Palazzo Bevilacqua, Verona, begun 1529

Michele Sanmicheli (1484–1559) from Verona in the terraferma, trained further south, and on his return to Verona in 1527 was hired by the state as a military architect. Most of his work was fortifications and military or naval buildings around the Venetian territories, especially in Verona, but he also built a number of palaces that are very original, and take Venetian architecture into Mannerism. His work in Verona represents a group of buildings defining the city in a way comparable to Palladio's in Vicenza. The Palazzo Bevilacqua in Verona (begun 1529) is the most famous of these.

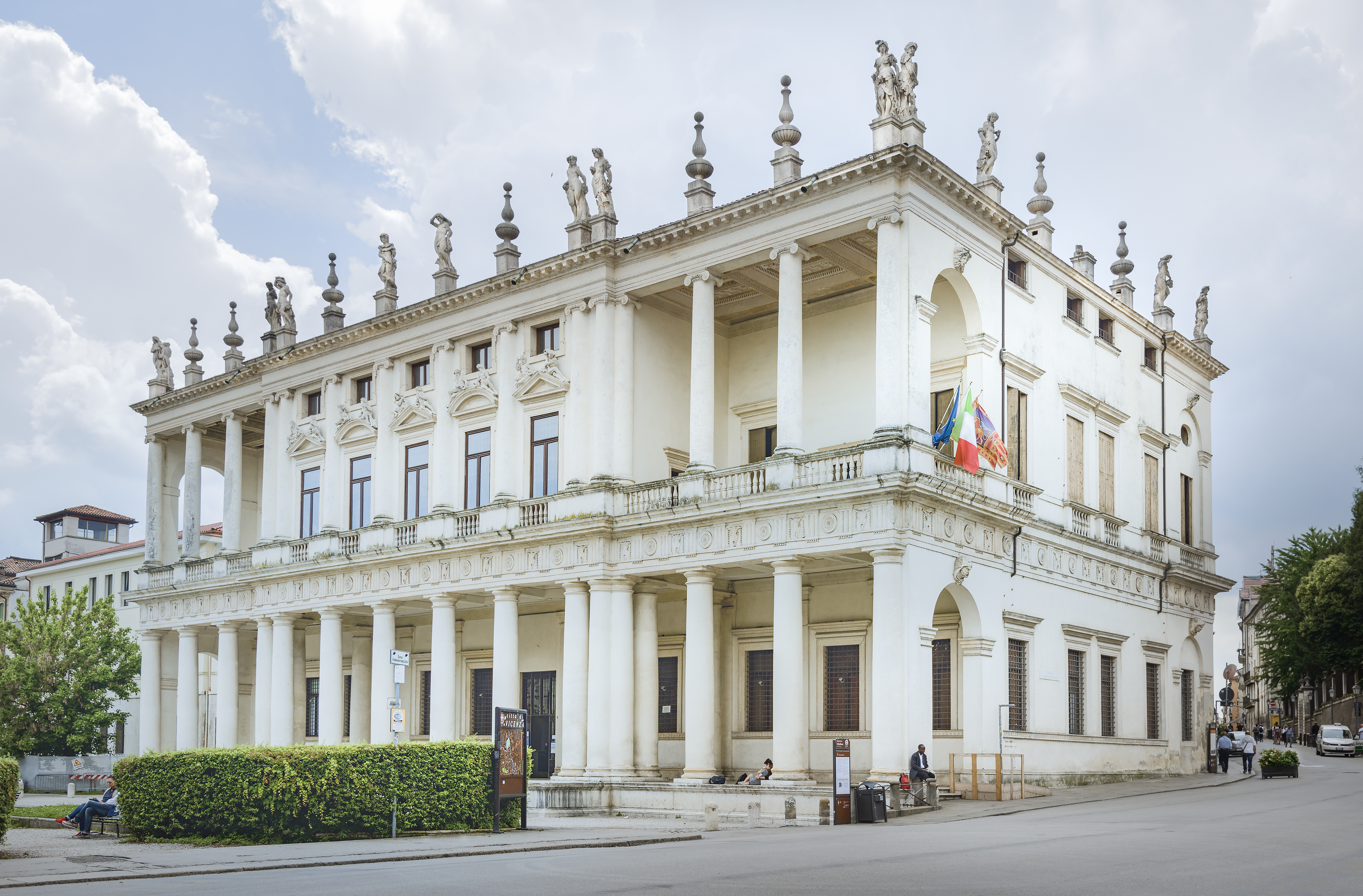
Palladio's Palazzo Chiericati, Vicenza, from 1551

The principal architect of the later Venetian Renaissance, was Andrea Palladio (1508–1580), who was also the key figure in later Italian Renaissance architecture, and its most important writer on architecture. But apart from the two large churches of San Giorgio Maggiore (1566 on), and Il Redentore (1577 on), he designed relatively little in the city itself, for a number of reasons. He designed many villas in the Veneto, in Vicenza and a series of famous country houses, relatively small compared to some further south, for the Venetian elite. Palladio's style was later developed in the Palladian architecture of both Britain and the American colonies, and his Venetian window, with a central arched top, took a very Venetian element around the world. The World Heritage Site of the City of Vicenza and the Palladian Villas of the Veneto includes 23 buildings in the city, and 24 country villas.

The so-called Basilica Palladiana in Vicenza, begun in 1549, is a series of facades with loggias encasing the large Gothic public hall of the city, used for purposes such as law courts, where his elaborated version of the Venetian window first appears; this is called a Palladian window or "Palladian motif". Here it appears in both storeys, which is less common when it has been copied. The building draws on Sansovino's Biblioteca Marciana, but is "more severely architectonic, less reliant on sculpture, and at the same time more flexible". In the Palazzo Chiericati, begun in 1551, there are again two storeys of loggias, but the facade is divided vertically into three parts by advancing the upper storey in the centre.

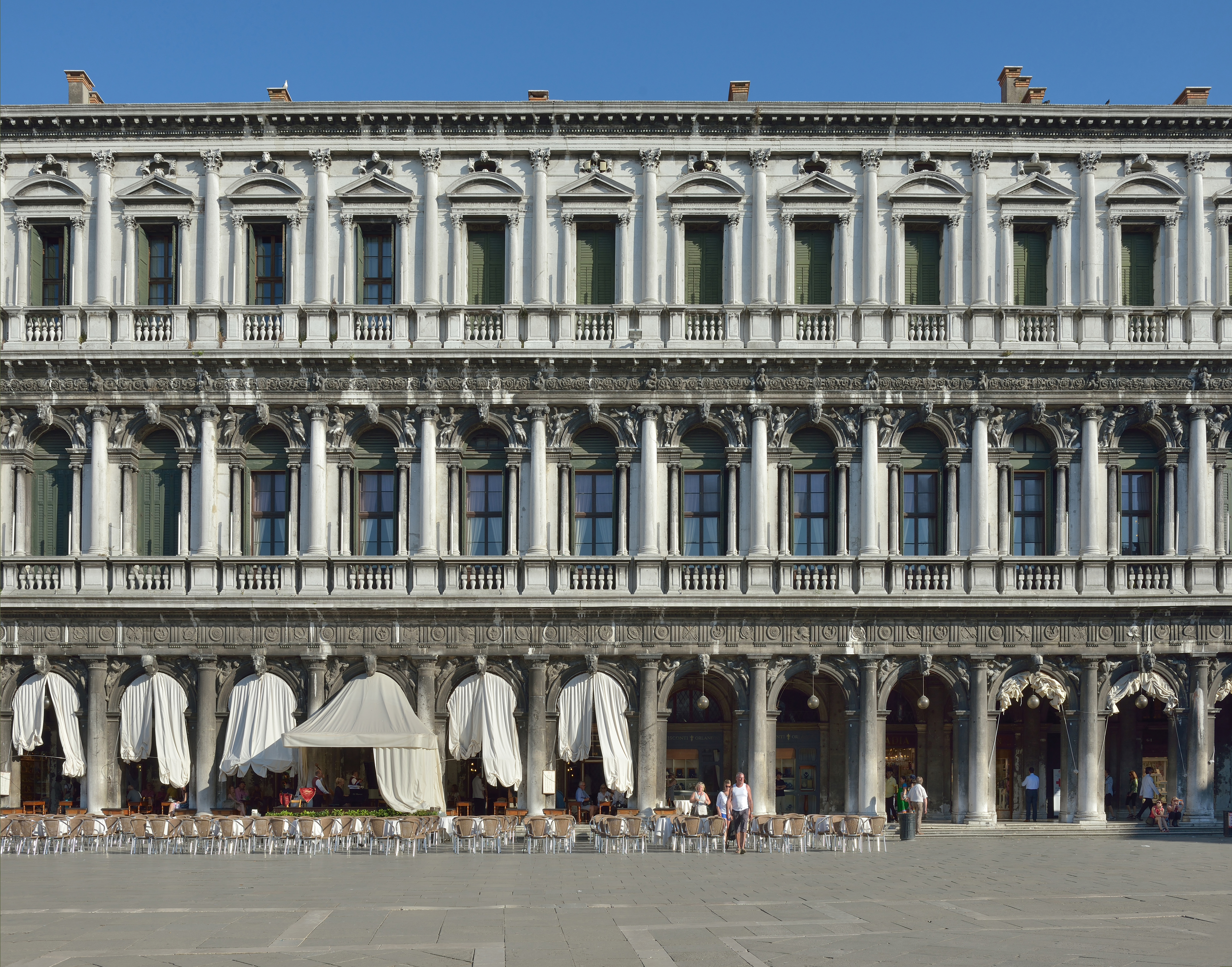
Vincenzo Scamozzi's Procuratie Nuove on the Piazza San Marco, begun 1586.

Vincenzo Scamozzi (1548–1616) from Vicenza only moved to Venice in 1581, the year after Palladio's death. He designed the Procuratie Nuove on the Piazza San Marco, and completed many projects Palladio had left incomplete. His pupil Baldassare Longhena (1598–1682), who was for a change born in the city, in turn completed Scamozzi's projects and, while he introduced a full-blown Baroque architecture to Venice, many buildings, especially palaces, continued to develop a Baroque form of the Venetian Renaissance style.

== Venetian books on architecture ==
Venice was a major European centre for all book printing publishing, and became the major centre for architectural publishing. Vitruvius is the only significant classical writer on architecture to survive, and his work De architectura was keenly studied by all Renaissance architects. Although the Latin text had been printed before, the first edition illustrated with woodcuts was produced by Fra Giovanni Giocondo in Venice in 1511; he had designed the Fondaco dei Tedeschi in 1505–08.

The "Seven Books" or Tutte l'opere d'architettura et prospetiva of Sebastiano Serlio (1475–1554) were also published in Venice, in several volumes from 1537 onwards. He had worked in the city as an architect, but left little mark. These were also heavily illustrated and became essential reading, and quickly copied and translated around Europe. The patrician humanist, clergyman and Venetian diplomat Daniele Barbaro was a patron of Palladio (Villa Barbaro), and Palladio illustrated his Italian translation of Vitruvius (1556). Palladio's own I quattro libri dell'architettura (1570), illustrated by himself, again had a huge influence across Europe.

Vincenzo Scamozzi's main book L’Idea dell’Architettura Universale was published in 1615, and essentially looks back to Palladio; it was influential in spreading Palladianism.

== External paintings ==
A considerable number of secular buildings had paintings on external walls, usually the facade. These were sometimes by major artists, but they have virtually all vanished now. A few very faded fragments of the frescos of around 1508 by Giorgione and Titian, mentioned by Vasari, were later removed and are now in the Ca'D'Oro. Giorgione also painted the entrance hall of the Ca' Vendramin Calergi.

== Byzantine revivalism ==
Venice had no history as an ancient Roman settlement, being founded on mudbanks in the Venetian Lagoon after the fall of the Roman Empire. Venetians liked to claim that the lack of any pagan contamination in their history gave a special "pure, legitimate and undefiled" quality to their Christianity. But the history of the city was for long intimately tied up with the Byzantine Empire, and references to Byzantine architecture were regarded as congenial to the ethos of the city's identity. This can be seen in the interior of San Salvador, on which several architects worked. Begun in 1508, soon after the St. Peter's Basilica in Rome, among other things this large church with an interior based on Greek crosses represented a Venetian riposte to Roman revivalism.

== Gallery ==
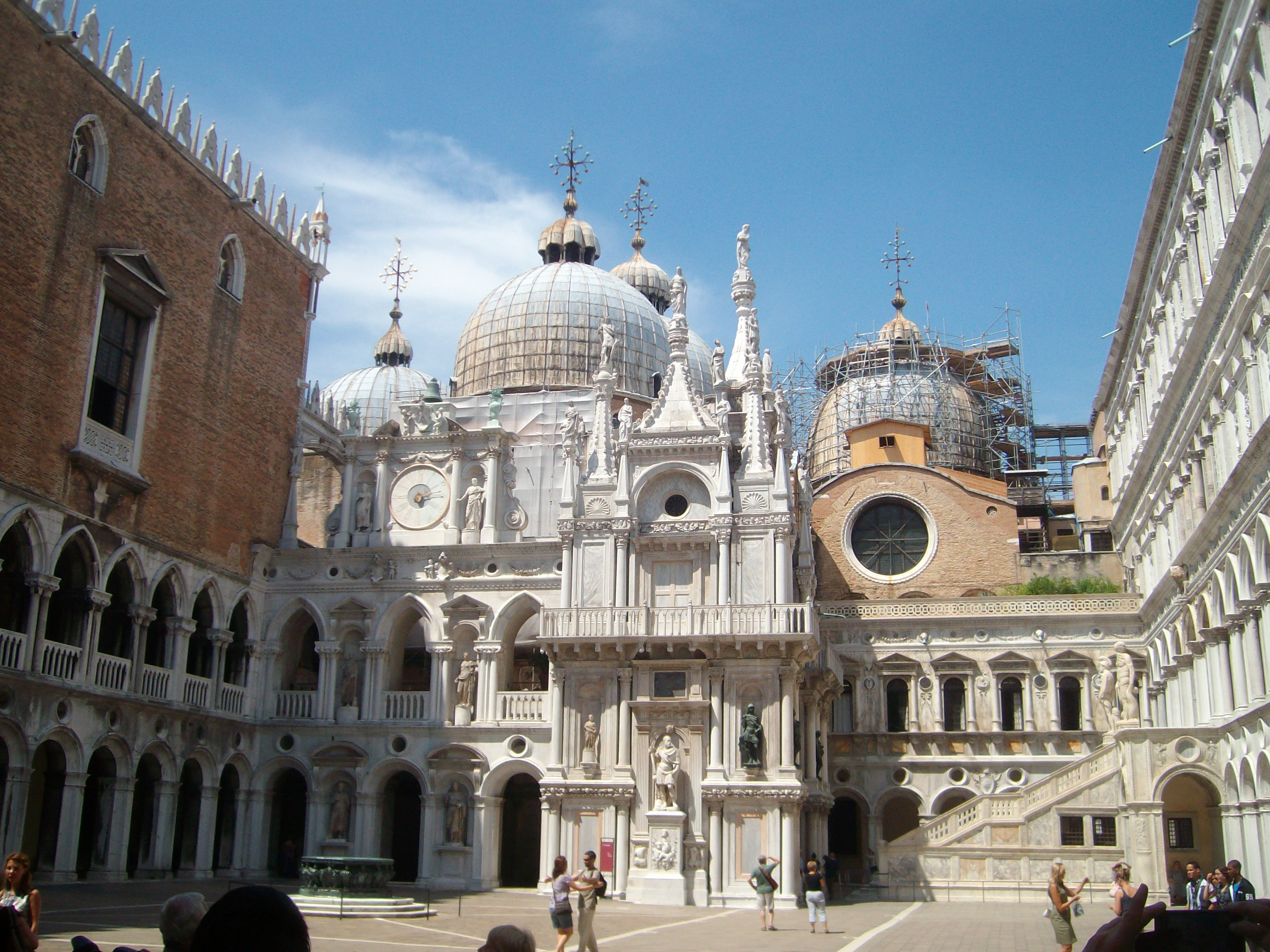
The Arco Foscari in the courtyard of the Doge's Palace, late 1450s

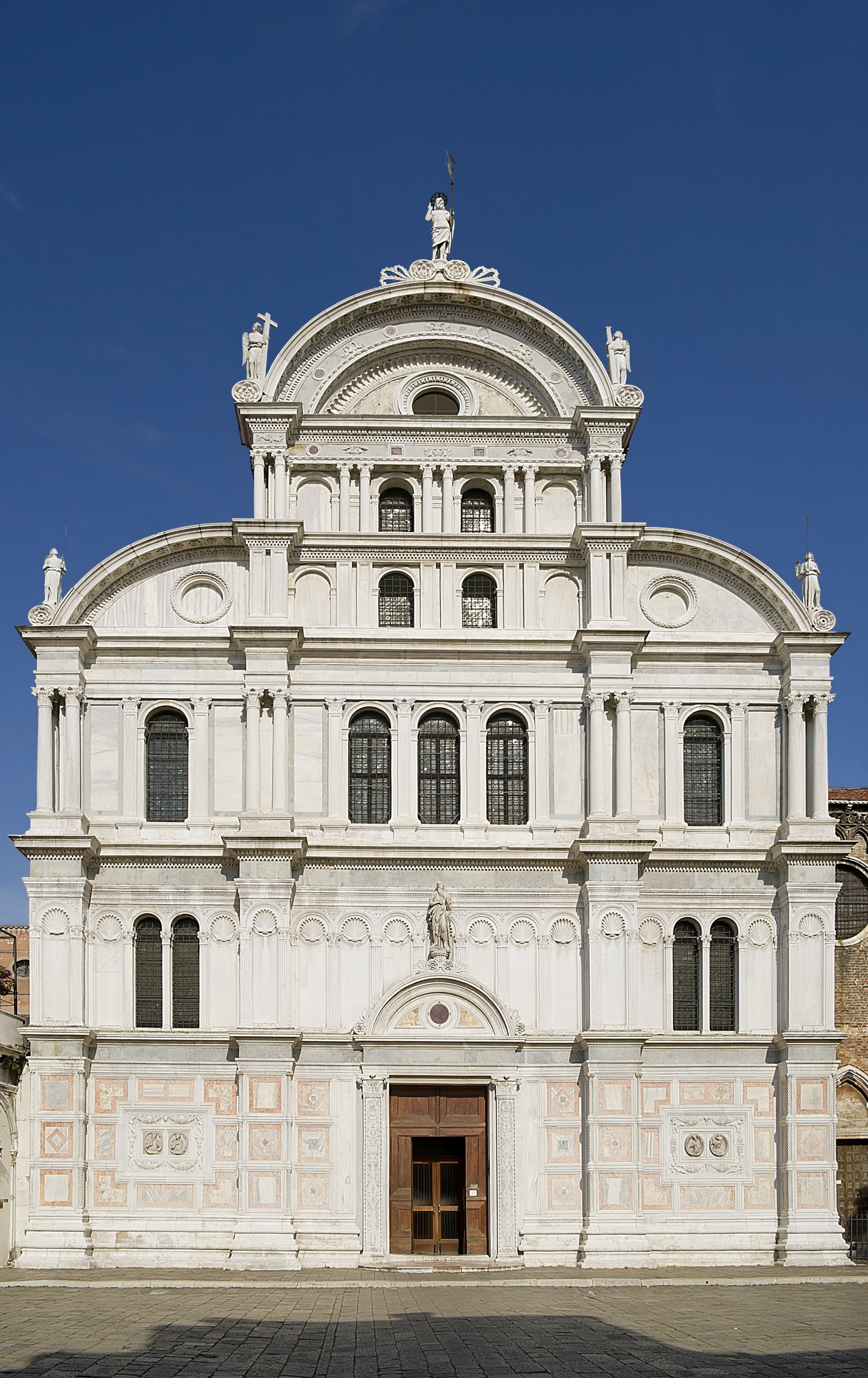
San Zaccaria, Venice, Codussi completed the upper parts of a church begun in Gothic

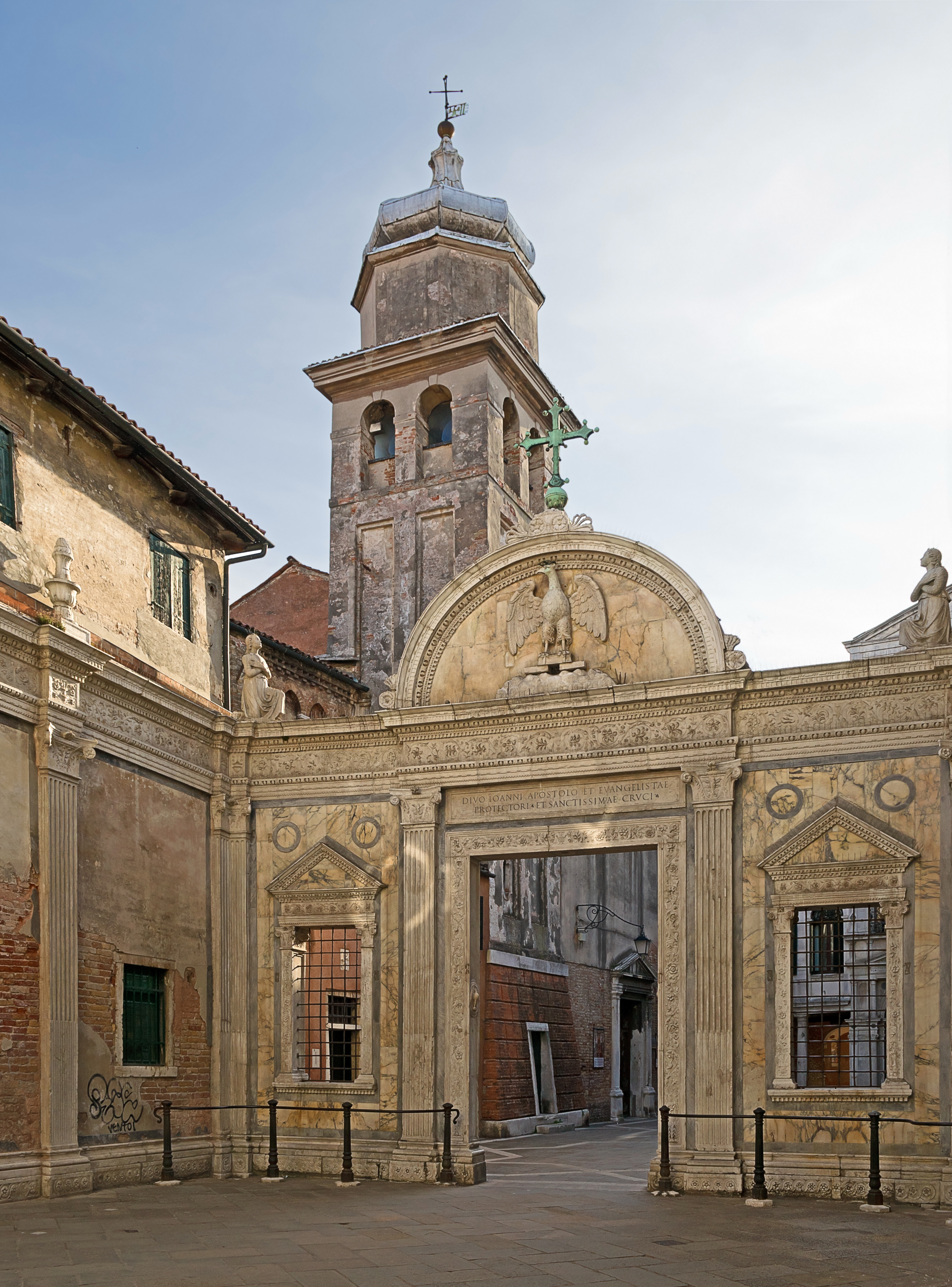
Scuola Grande di San Giovanni Evangelista, screen by Pietro Lombardo, 1485

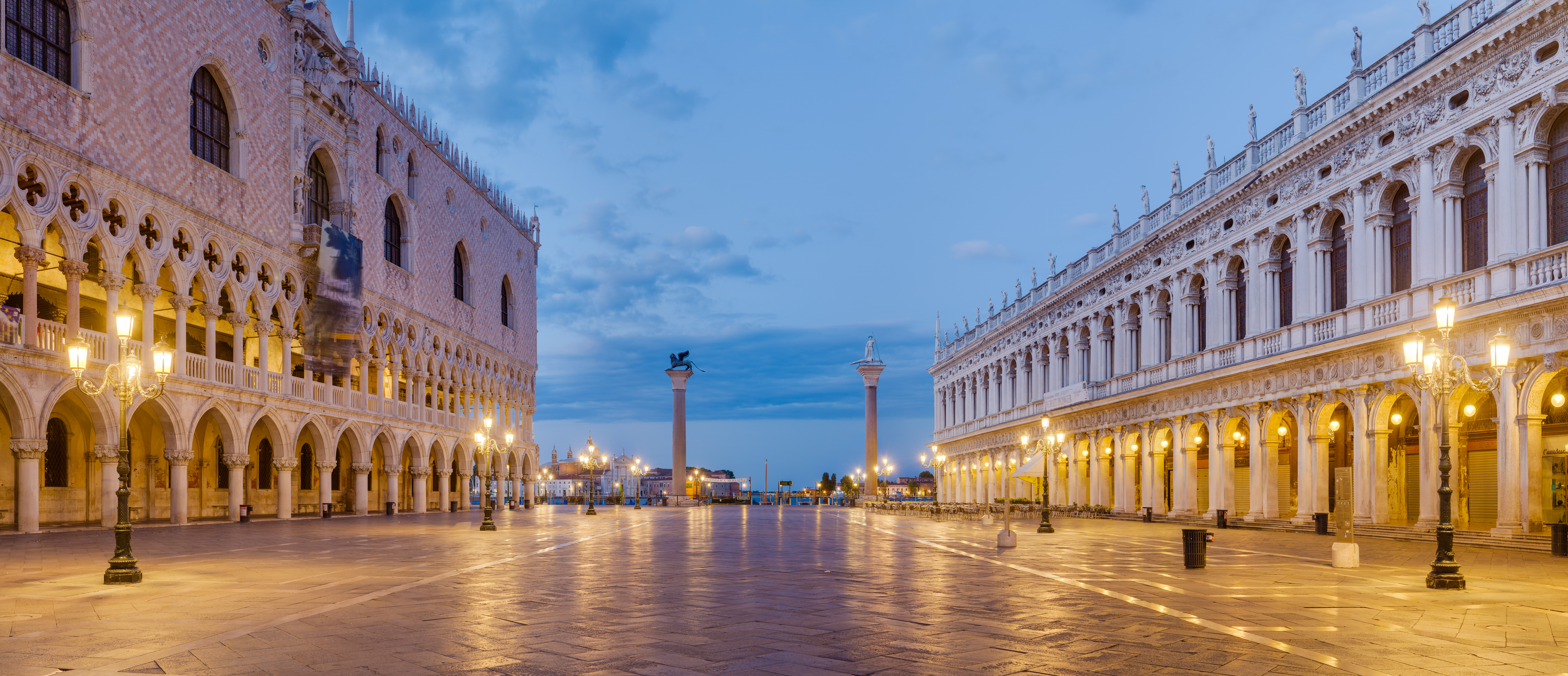
Harmony between the Doges' Palace at left and Biblioteca Marciana at right

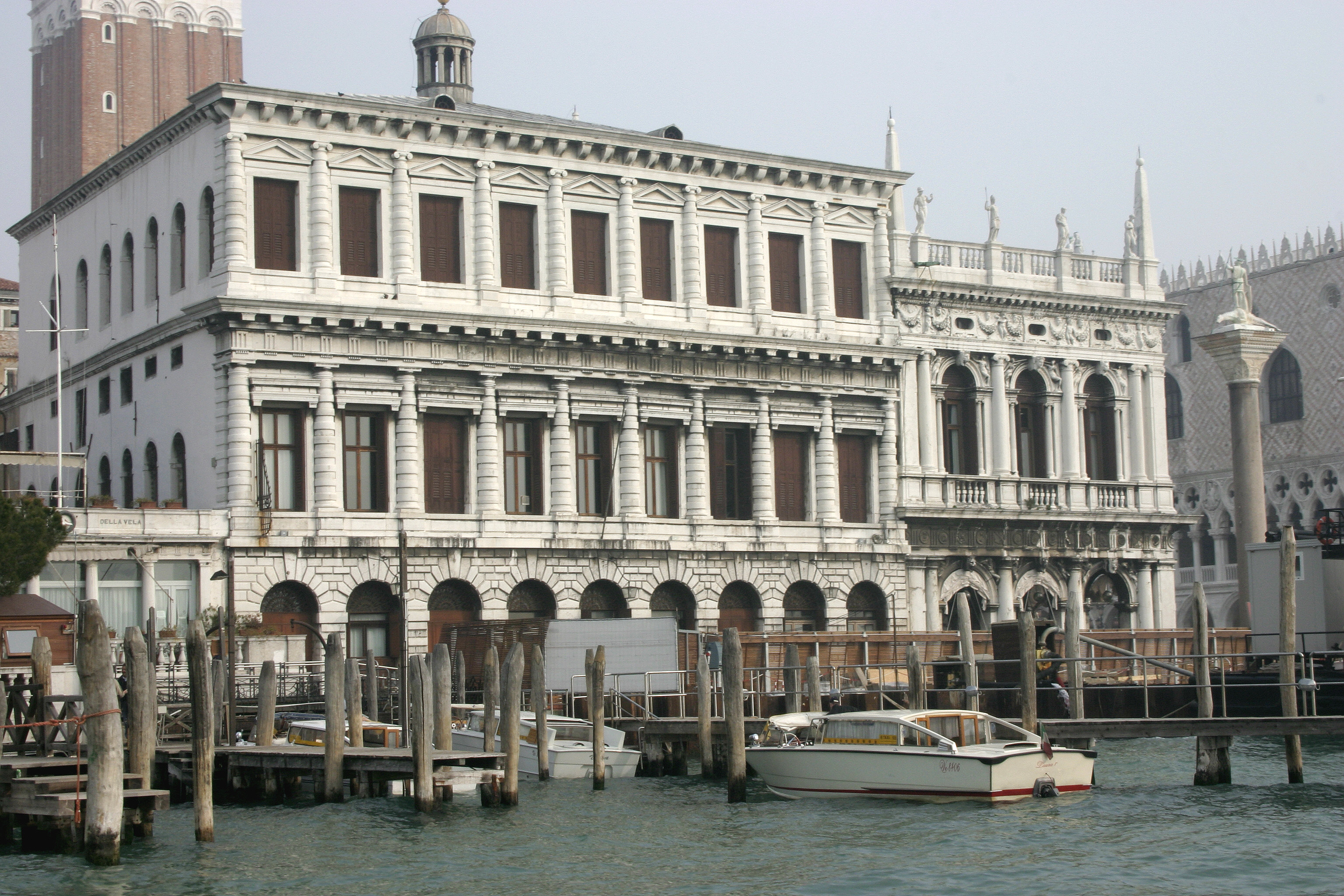
Sansovino's Zecca, with the Biblioteca Marciana and Doge's Palace beyond

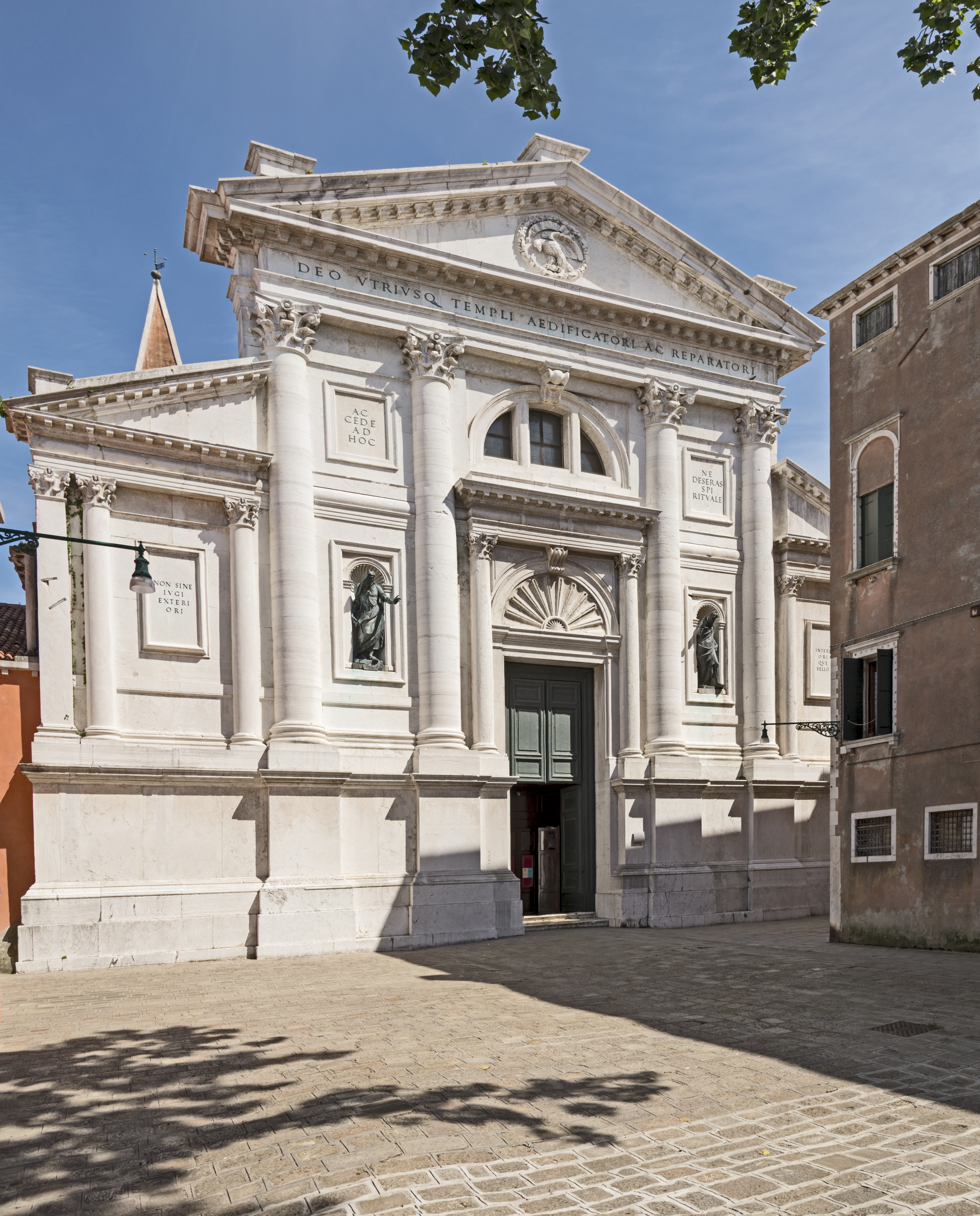
San Francesco della Vigna, begun by Sansovino (1554) and finished by Palladio

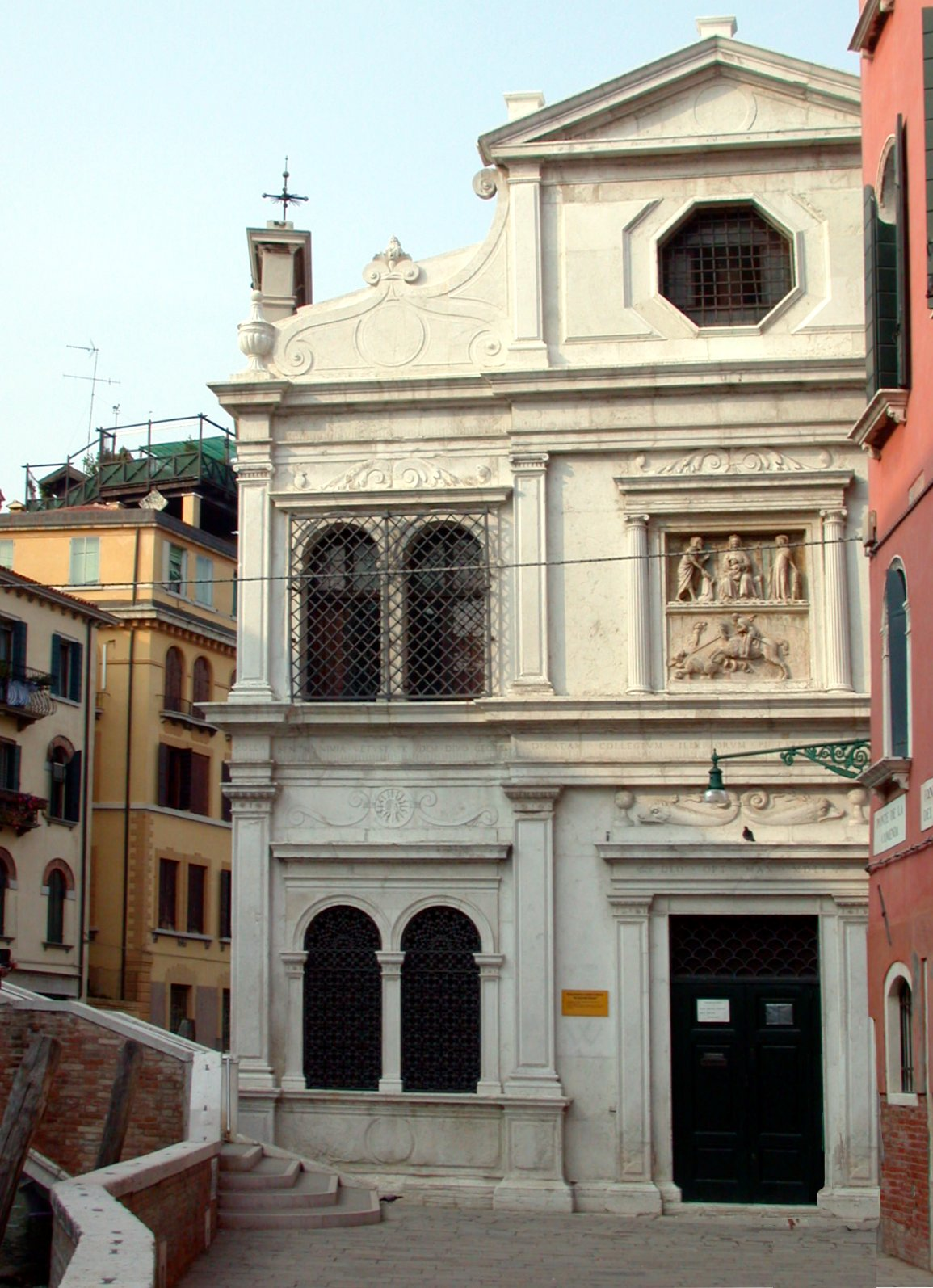
Scuola di San Giorgio degli Schiavoni, Sansovino and Giovanni De Zan

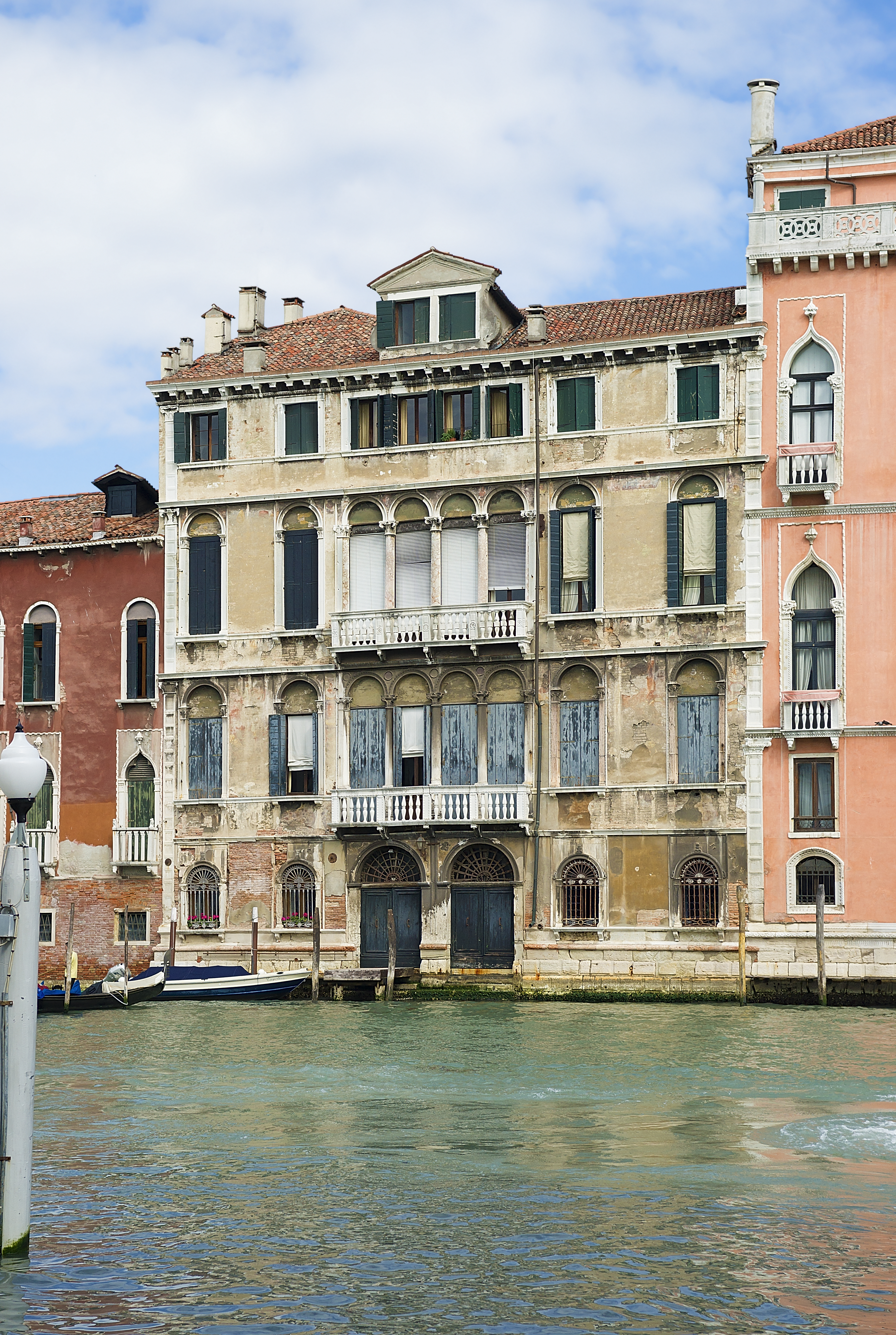
Palazzo Tiepolo, the facade originally frescoed by Andrea Schiavone (faint traces remain)

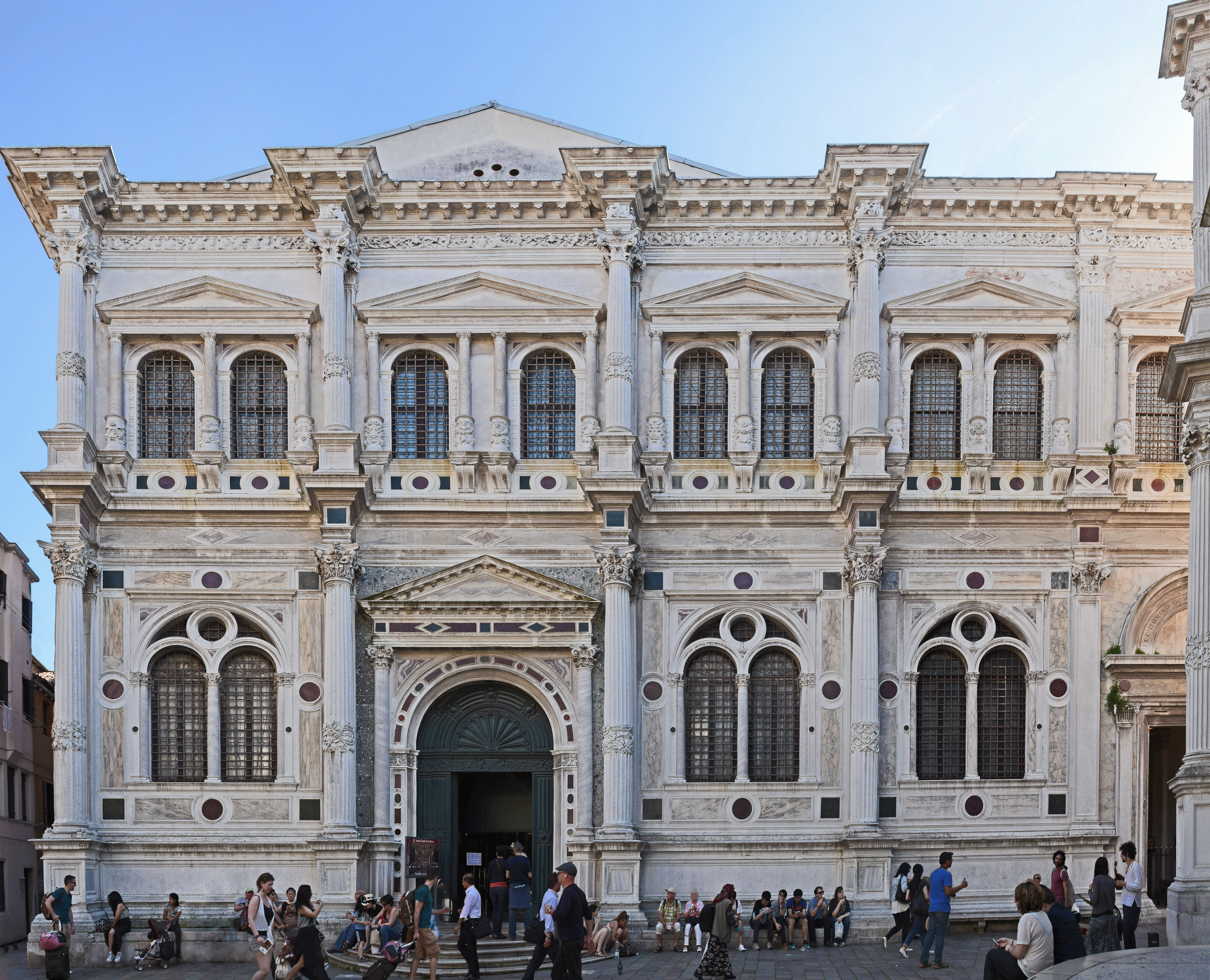
Scuola Grande di San Rocco, various architects

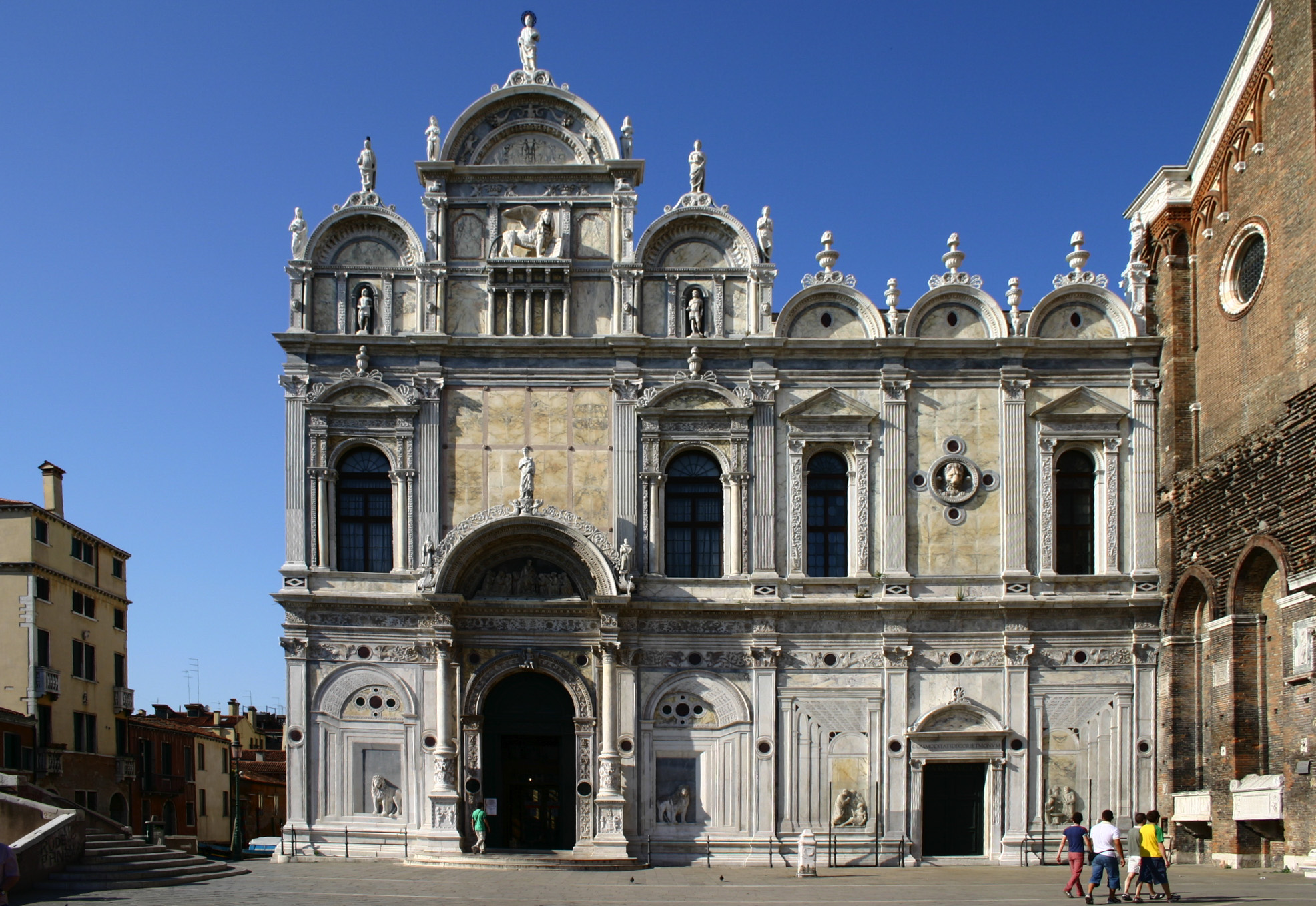
Scuola Grande di San Marco, now a hospital, Pietro Lombardo and Codrussi

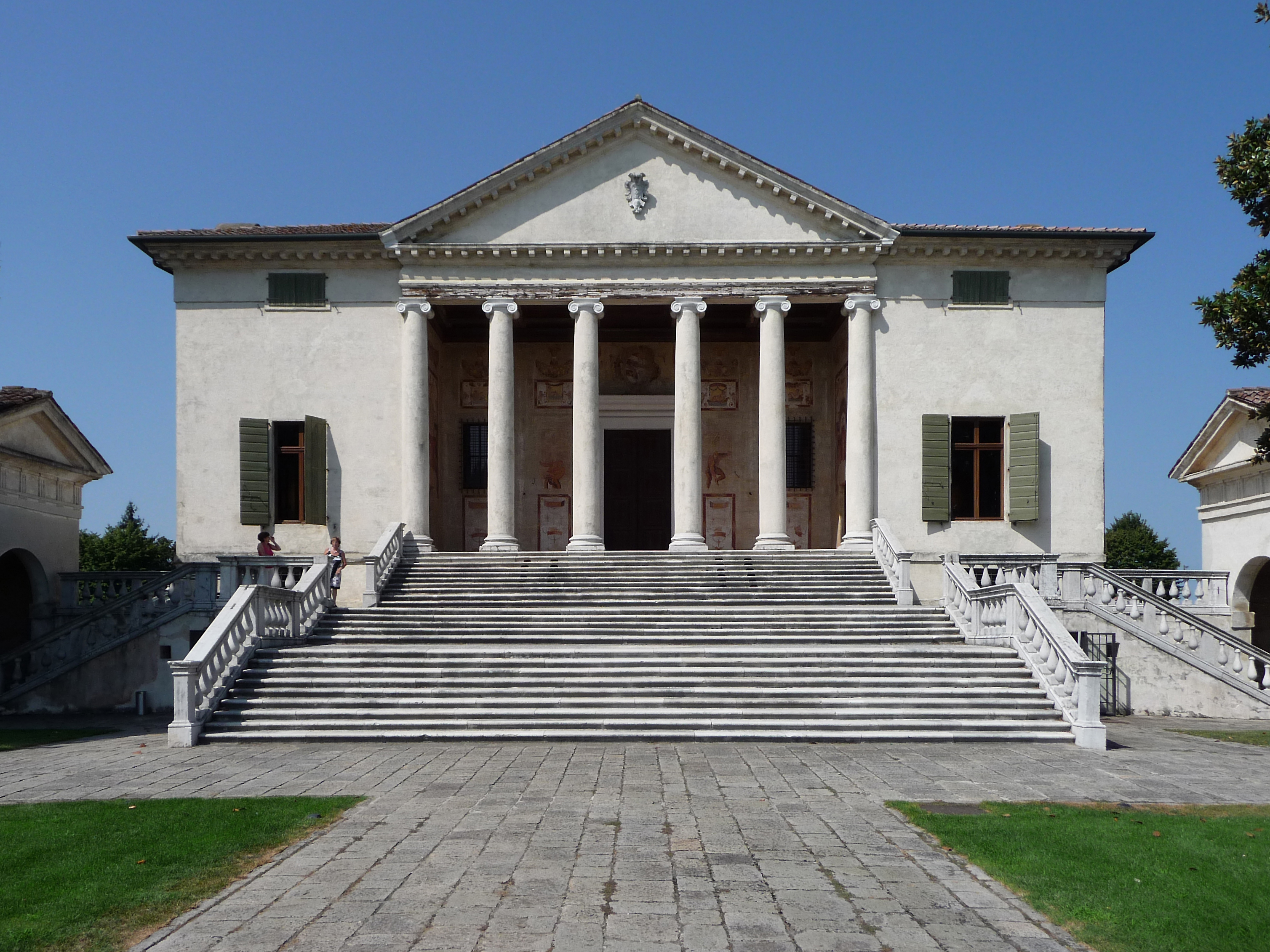
Palladio, Villa Badoer, 1556 on, one of his villas on the terrafirma

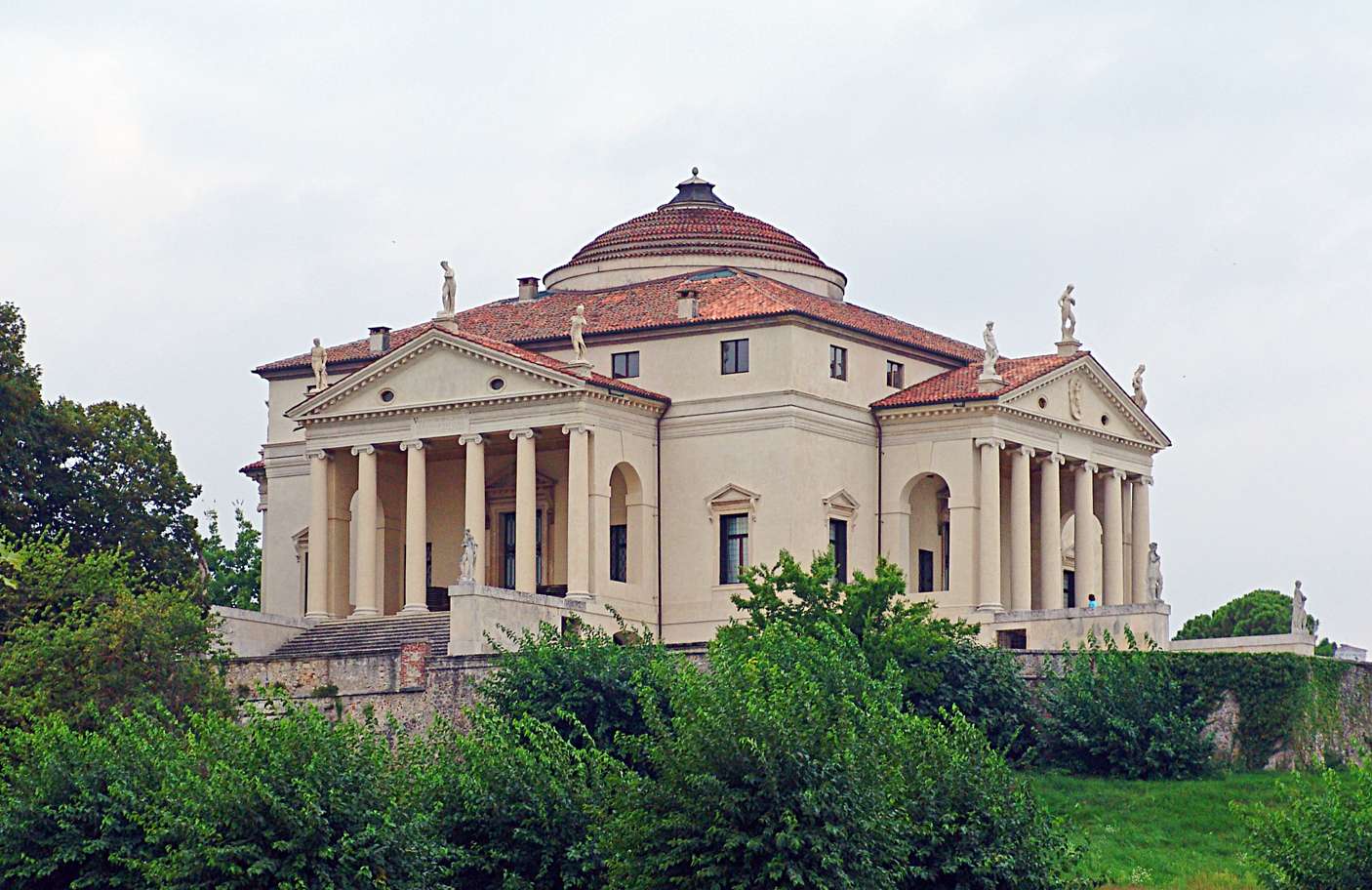
Palladio's Villa Capra La Rotonda, begun 1567

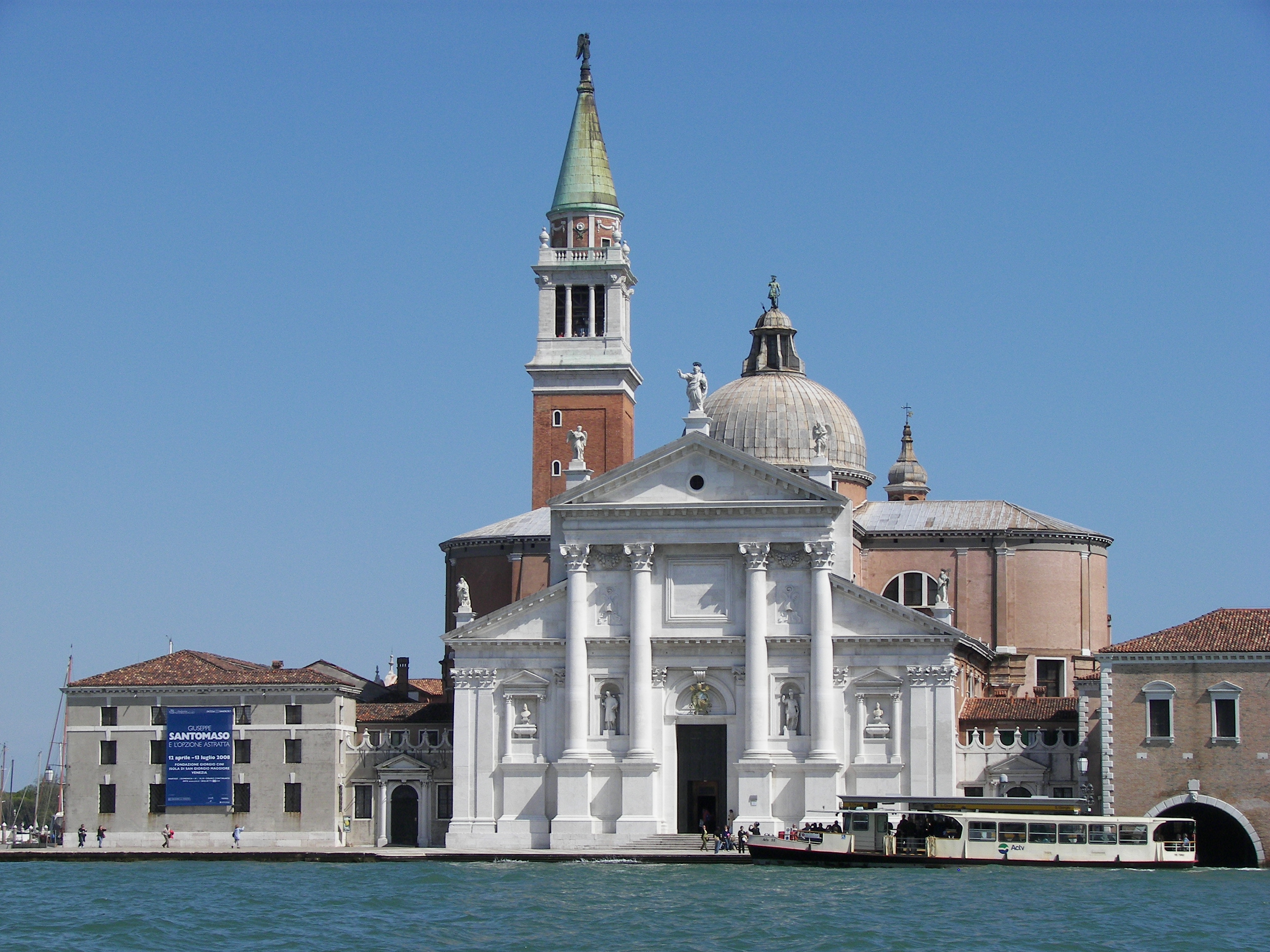
Palladio's San Giorgio Maggiore, begun 1566

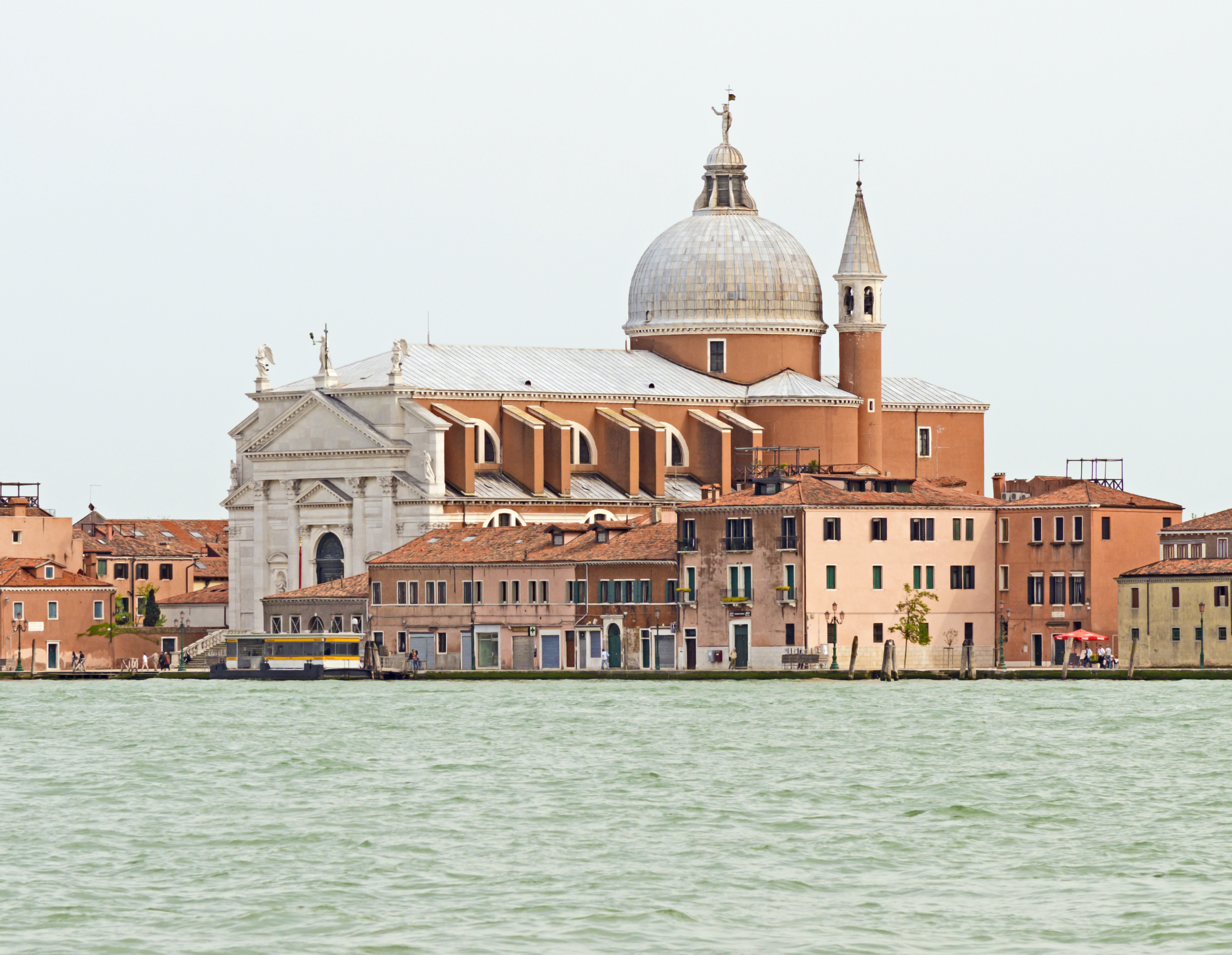
Palladio, the Redentore church, begun 1577

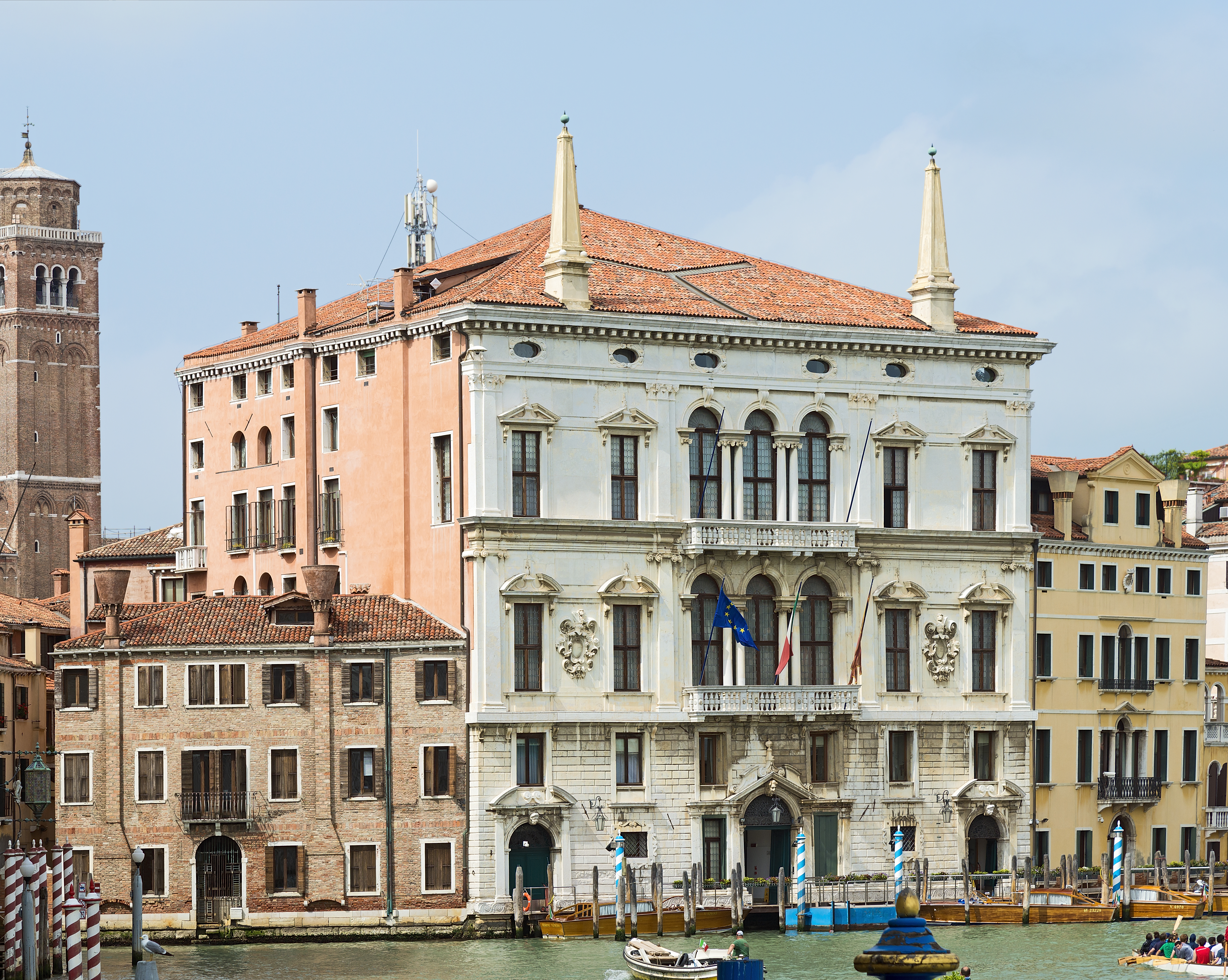
Palazzo Balbi, Alessandro Vittoria, 1582

== See also ==
- Venetian Renaissance
- List of churches in Venice
- List of palaces in Venice
- List of buildings and structures in Venice
- History of the Republic of Venice
- History of the Doge's Palace in Venice
