= Lombardo (family) =

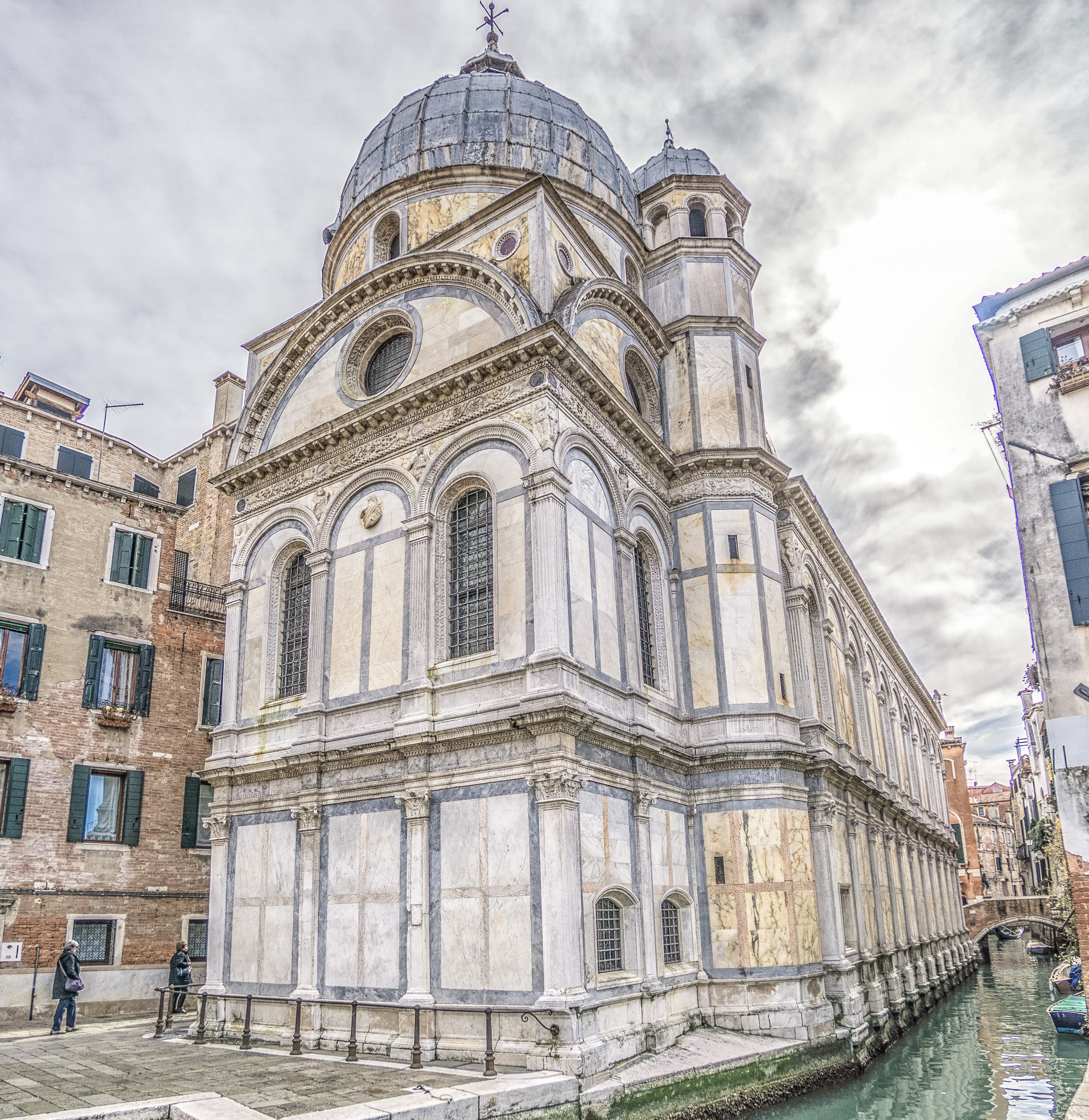
Santa Maria dei Miracoli, Venice, 1480s, designed by Pietro Lombardo, who was mainly Venice's leading sculptor.

Lombardo, the name of a family of Venetian sculptors and architects; their surname was apparently Solaro, and the name of Lombardo was given to the earliest known, Martino, who emigrated from Lombardy to Venice in the middle of the 15th century AD and became celebrated as an architect.

Martino Lombardo had two sons, Moro and Pietro, of whom the latter (c. 1435–1515) was one of the greatest sculptors and architects of his time, while his sons Antonio (died 1516) and Tullio (died 1532) were hardly less celebrated. Tullio's son Sante Lombardo (1504–1560) is purely known as an architect.

== Pietro ==
Pietro's work as an architect is seen in numerous churches, the Ca' Vendramin Calergi (1481, with Mauro Codussi), the doge 's palace (1498), the facade (1485) of the scuola of St. Mark's, Venice and the cathedral of Cividale del Friuli (1502); but he is now more famous as a sculptor, often in collaboration with his sons; he executed the tomb of the doge Mocenigo (1478) in the church of San Giovanni e Paolo at Venice, and a bas-relief for the tomb of Dante at Ravenna, and in 1483 began the beautiful decorations in the church of Santa Maria dei Miracoli, Venice, which is associated with his workshop.

== Antonio ==
Antonio's masterpiece is the marble relief of St. Anthony making a new-born child speak in defence of its mother's honour, in the Santo at Padua (1505).

== Tullio ==
Tullio's best-known works are the four kneeling angels (1484) in the Church of San Martino, Venice, a coronation of the Virgin Mary in San Giovanni Crisostomo and two bas-reliefs in the Santo, Padua, besides two others formerly in the Spitzer collection, representing Vulcan's Forge and Minerva disputing with Neptune.

== See also ==
- Santo Stefano di Venezia
- San Salvador di Venezia
- Basilica di San Zanipolo
- Basilica di Santa Maria Gloriosa dei Frari
