= Santa Maria dei Miracoli, Venice =

Renaissance church in Venice

Santa Maria dei Miracoli
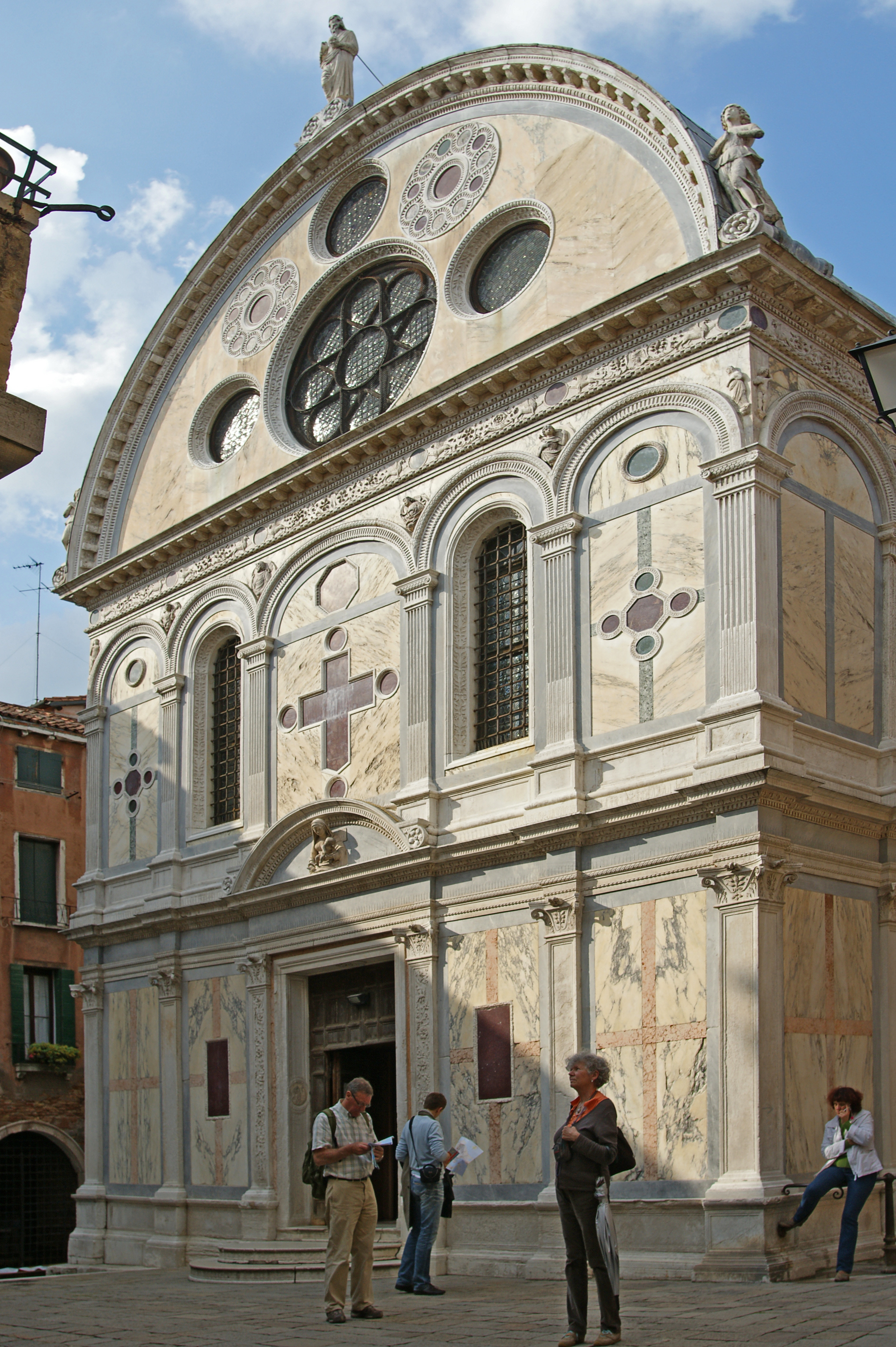
- Santa Maria dei Miracoli in Venice

- Location within Venice Location within Italy

Religion
- Affiliation: Roman Catholic
- Province: Venice

Location
- Location: Venice, Italy
- Coordinates: 45°26′22″N 12°20′21″E

Architecture
- Groundbreaking: 1481
- Completed: 1489

Santa Maria dei Miracoli is a church in the sestiere of Cannaregio, in Venice, Italy, designed in 1481 by Renaissance architect Pietro Lombardo and his sons Tullio and Antonio. It was completed in 1489.

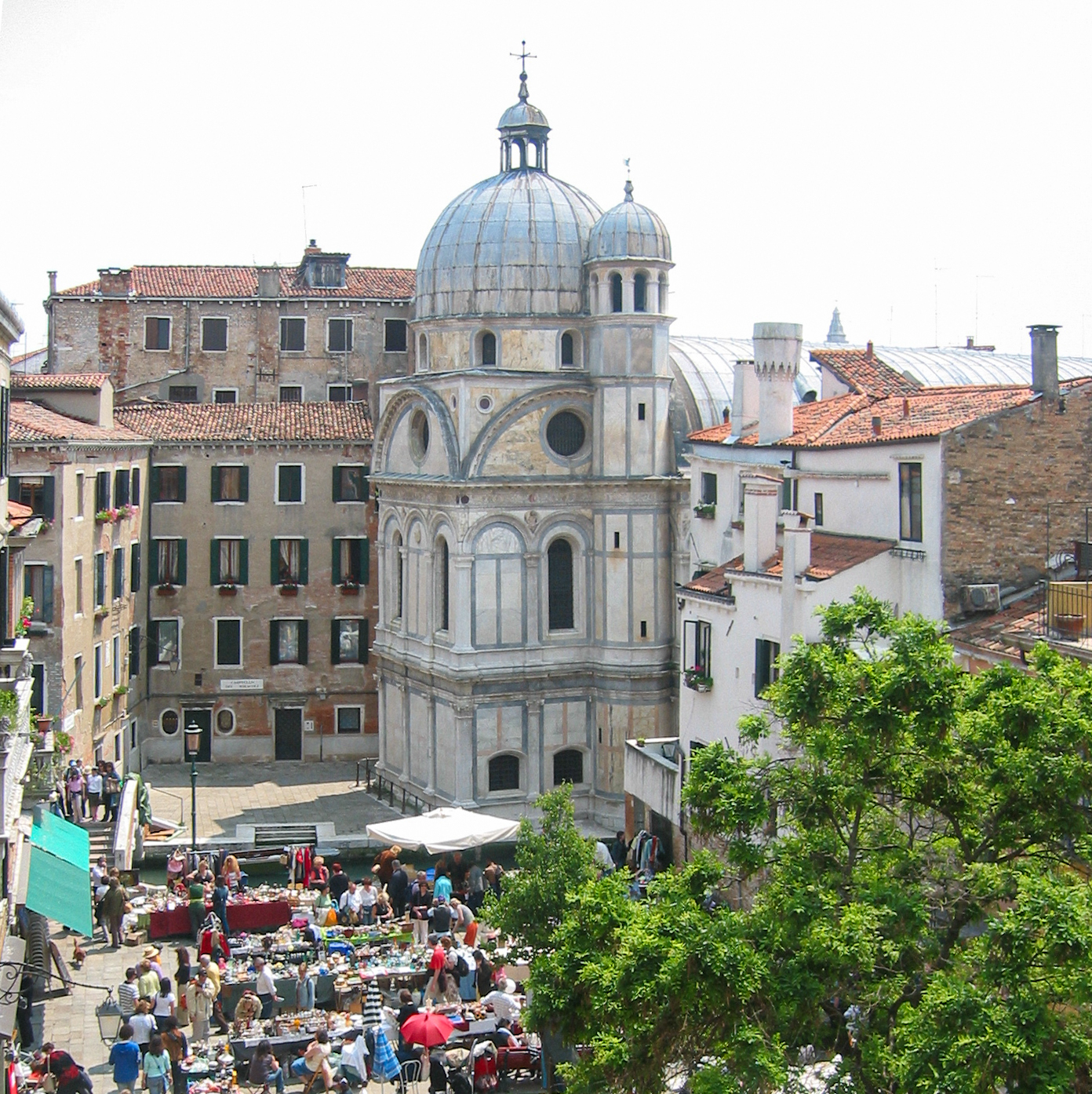
The apse at the northeast end comprising the elevated choir, seen from Campo di Santa Maria Nova across the Rio dei Miracoli

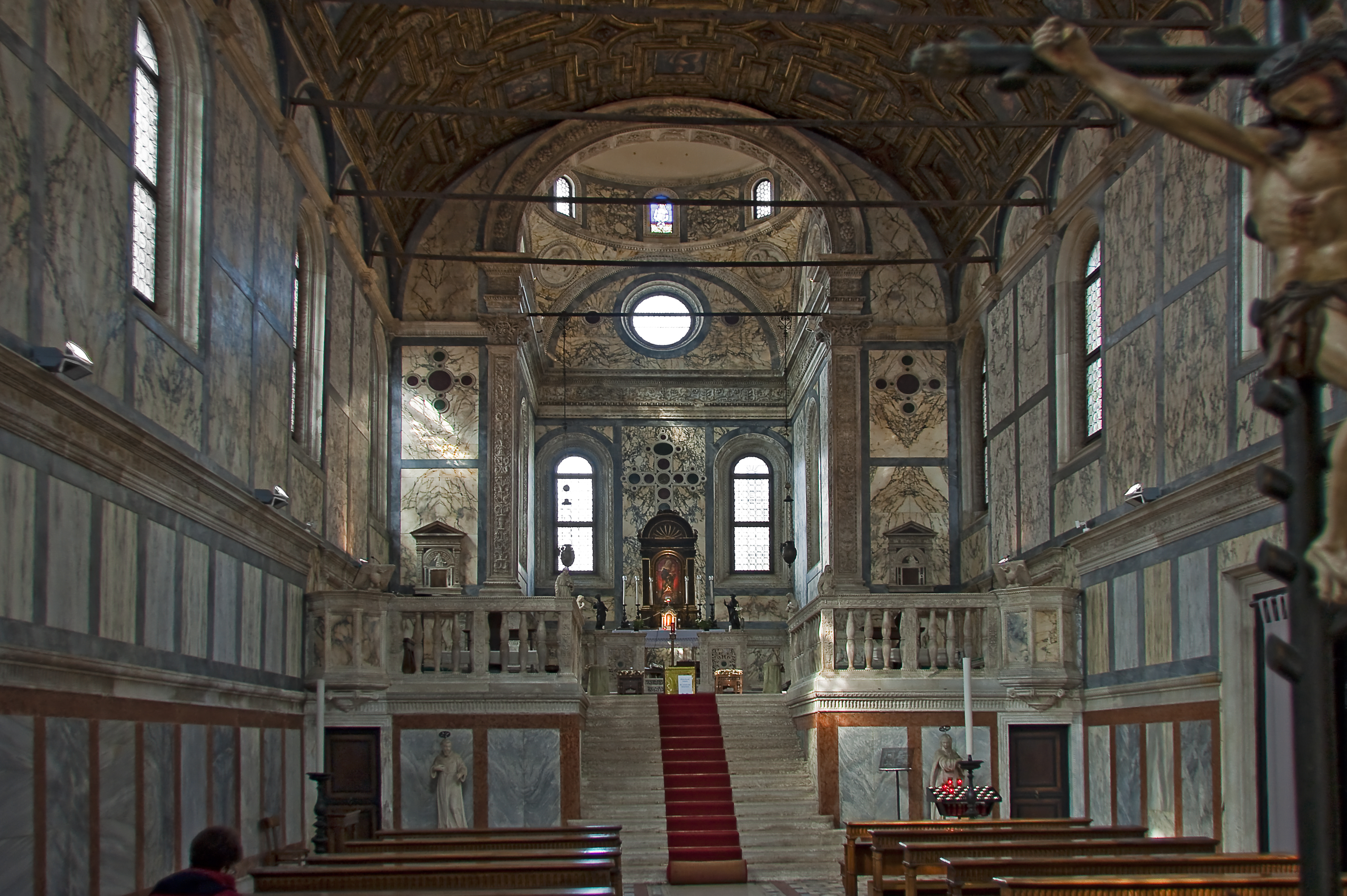
The interior: a single nave and staircase to the choir

== History ==
In the second half of the 15th century, a votive painting stood on the street at the corner of the home of the Venetian silk merchant Angelo Amadi. The work had been commissioned in 1408 from Niccolò di Pietro by Amadi's ancestor Francesco, alongside a similar piece ordered from Gentile da Fabriano. Regarded as miraculous by local residents, Nicolò's painting became a focal point for the neighborhood and the patron himself, who turned to it to seek divine favors. This devotion sparked both a private desire and a public need in 1480 to erect a new church to house the precious painting. The project was entrusted to the architect Pietro Lombardo, who, with the assistance of his sons Tullio and Antonio, designed and built this small sanctuary over the course of eight years, between 1481 and 1489. The plans for the church were expanded in 1484 to include the construction of a new convent for nuns of St. Clare to the east. The convent was connected to the gallery of the church by an enclosed walkway that was later destroyed.

In the 1990s Santa Maria dei Miracoli underwent a substantial restoration (see below). Since then the church is part of the Chorus Association (founded in 1997), which unites twenty churches throughout the city of Venice.

== Architecture ==
Also known as the "marble church", it is one of the best examples of the early Venetian Renaissance architecture including colored marble, a blind arcade of pilasters on the exterior walls, and a semicircular pediment. The circular facade windows recall Donato Bramante's churches in Milan.

The church is situated on a small island north of Piazza San Marco and west of Santi Giovanni e Paolo. It has a rectangular structure oriented to the northeast: the façade and the apse face two small squares, the right side overlooks a narrow street (calle), while the left side borders the Canal dei Miracoli. Across a bridge the northeastern square opens up to the large Campo Santa Maria Nova.

The two-storeyed façade and walls are divided by pilasters resulting in blind arches, five on the front, eleven on the side walls, the sidewall to the street additionally structured by four windows (the wall facing the water has just one). The two orders are arranged in reverse to the classical Vitruvian canons: the lower order features simplified Corinthian capitals on profiled pilasters (cymatium) that carry the entablature (with dentil and cyma cornices), while the upper fluted shafts rise from a pedestal the hight of the architrave and topped by capitals of the Ionic order.

Busts of prophets occupy the spandrels between the arches along the building, giving way to full-length figures of angels in the corner spandrels. Above them a frieze runs around the building with symmetrical floral decor flanked by griffins, above each pilaster a patera with inlays of red and green marble. The sculptures at the higher levels were carved by various stonemasons of differing skill, who likely did not belong to Pietro Lombardo's workshop.

The façade is completed by a semicircular pediment spanning the whole width of the building, flanked by devotional figures of a woman and a man, and crowned by Christ Pantocrator. Around a central rose window, three oculi echo the triangle of the statues, complemented by two ornate marble patera.

The whole façade is adorned with marble revetments inlaid with squares, crosses, stars, and wheels, clad in polychrome marbles, like veined Tuscan pavonazzetto, serpentine, yellow and red marble, and the common white Istrian stone.

The central arch of the facade is made wider for the portal (with a compressed arch on top). The pilasters flanking the portal have floral reliefs filling the cornice. Bas-reliefs depicting saints, scenes from the life of Jesus, and the Assumption of the Virgin are carved into the roundels on the portal doorposts. The curvilinear tympanum above the portal features a bust of the Madonna and Child, a work by sculptor Giovanni Giorgio Lascaris, dated 1480.

== Interior ==
The interior is enclosed by a wide barrel vault, with a single nave. The nave is dominated by an ornamental marble stair rising between two pulpits, with statues by Tullio Lombardo, Alessandro Vittoria and Niccolò di Pietro. The vaulted ceiling is divided into fifty coffers decorated with paintings of prophets, a work by Girolamo Pennacchi's contemporaries, Vincenzo dalle Destre and Lattanzio da Rimini.

It is one of the very first Renaissance-style buildings constructed in Venice. Modifications were made to the interior during the 16th century.

== Restoration ==
The organisation Save Venice Inc. restored the church over a period of seven years, from 1990 to 1997 (after several years of preliminary research). The treatments focussed on the marble sheeting and sculptural decoration of both the exterior and interior of the church. The marble cladding contained 14% salt, and was on the point of bursting, when restorers began the desalination and cleaning process. All marble cladding was removed, and cleaned in a solution of distilled water.

Additionally, the campaign worked in the coffered ceiling, which was made up of fifty-two wooden panels depicting saints and prophets. The cleaning led to the rediscovery of frescos of sibyls on the spandrels of the ceiling. Nearly every part of the church was examined and treated, including the intarsia doors in the presbytery, the bronze statues and candelabra of the high altar, and the wooden panel of the Madonna from which the church got its name. The restoration was calculated to cost 1 million dollars, the final cost was 4 million dollars.

== See also ==
- Late medieval domes
- Italian Renaissance domes
