= Saint Augustine and Alypius Receiving Ponticianus =

Painting by Niccolò di Pietro

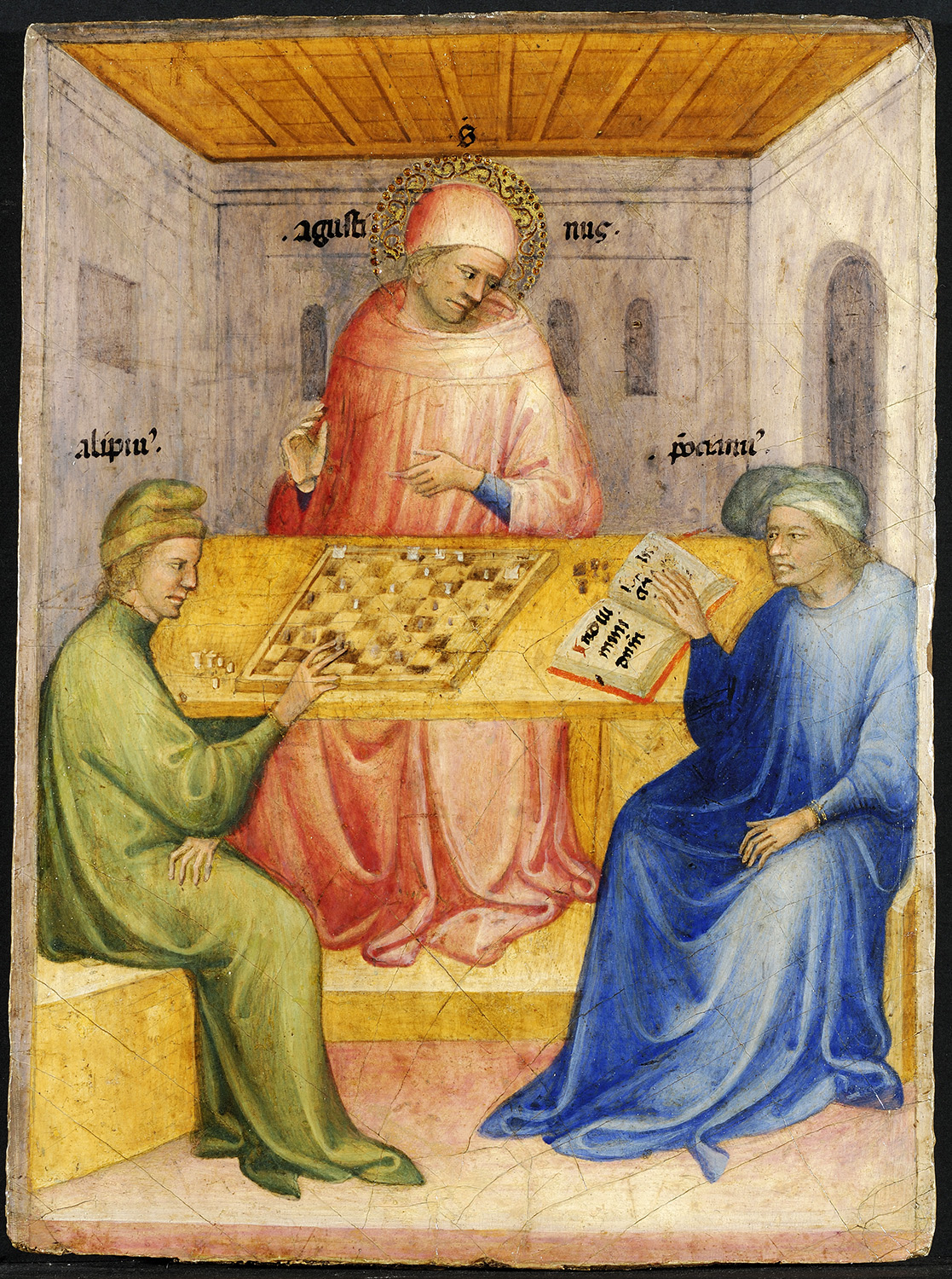
Saint Augustine and Alypius Receiving Ponticianus (1414-1415) by Nicolò di Pietro

Saint Augustine and Alypius Receiving Ponticianus is a 1414–1415 painting by Nicolò di Pietro, which has been in the collection of the Musée des Beaux-Arts de Lyon since 2009. The painting illustrates the episode of Saint Augustine of Hippo's conversion.

== Sources ==
- "Saint Augustin et Alypius reçoivent la visite de Ponticianus - Musée des Beaux Arts de Lyon". mba-lyon.fr.
