= Antonio Lombardo (sculptor) =

Italian Renaissance sculptor (died 1516)

Antonio Lombardo (c.1458–1516) was an Italian Renaissance sculptor.

== Life ==
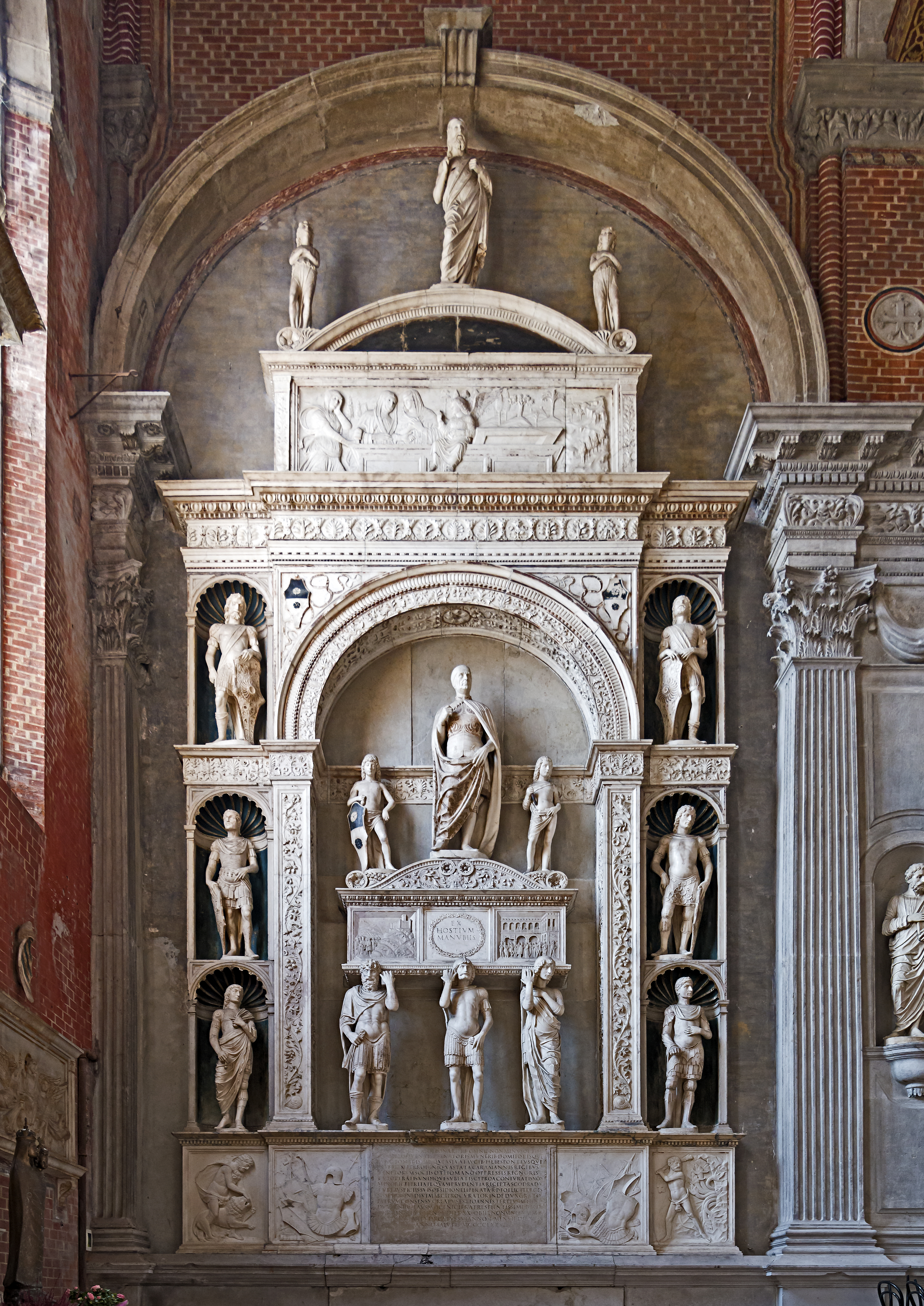
Monumento del doge Pietro Mocenigo, Santi Giovanni e Paolo (Venice)

Lombardo was born in Venice, the son of Pietro Lombardo and brother of Tullio Lombardo. The Lombardo family worked together to sculpt church decorations and tombs such as the funerary monument of Pietro Mocenigo. Their work can be observed in the Franciscan church of San Giobbe in Venice.

He trained in his father’s workshop, but unlike his father and brother Tullio, he practised sculpture exclusively. He also worked in bronze, and his output encompasses secular and mythological subjects as well as sacred pieces. He and his brother designed the Malchiostro Chapel in the Cattedrale di San Pietro Apostolo in Treviso.

In 1504 Lombardo was commissioned to build a funerary chapel in the atrium of the Basilica of San Marco for Cardinal Giovanni Battista Zen. Lombardo is credited with both the design of the chapel and the bronze figures of the Madonna and Child. His 1505 marble relief of St. Anthony making a new-born child speak in defense of its mother's honor, in the Basilica of Saint Anthony of Padua, has been cited as his masterpiece.

In 1506 he moved to Ferrara, where he worked as marble master for Alfonso I d'Este, Duke of Ferrara. Twenty-eight marble reliefs attributed to Lombardo are now in the Hermitage, St Petersburg. Lombardo died in Ferrara.

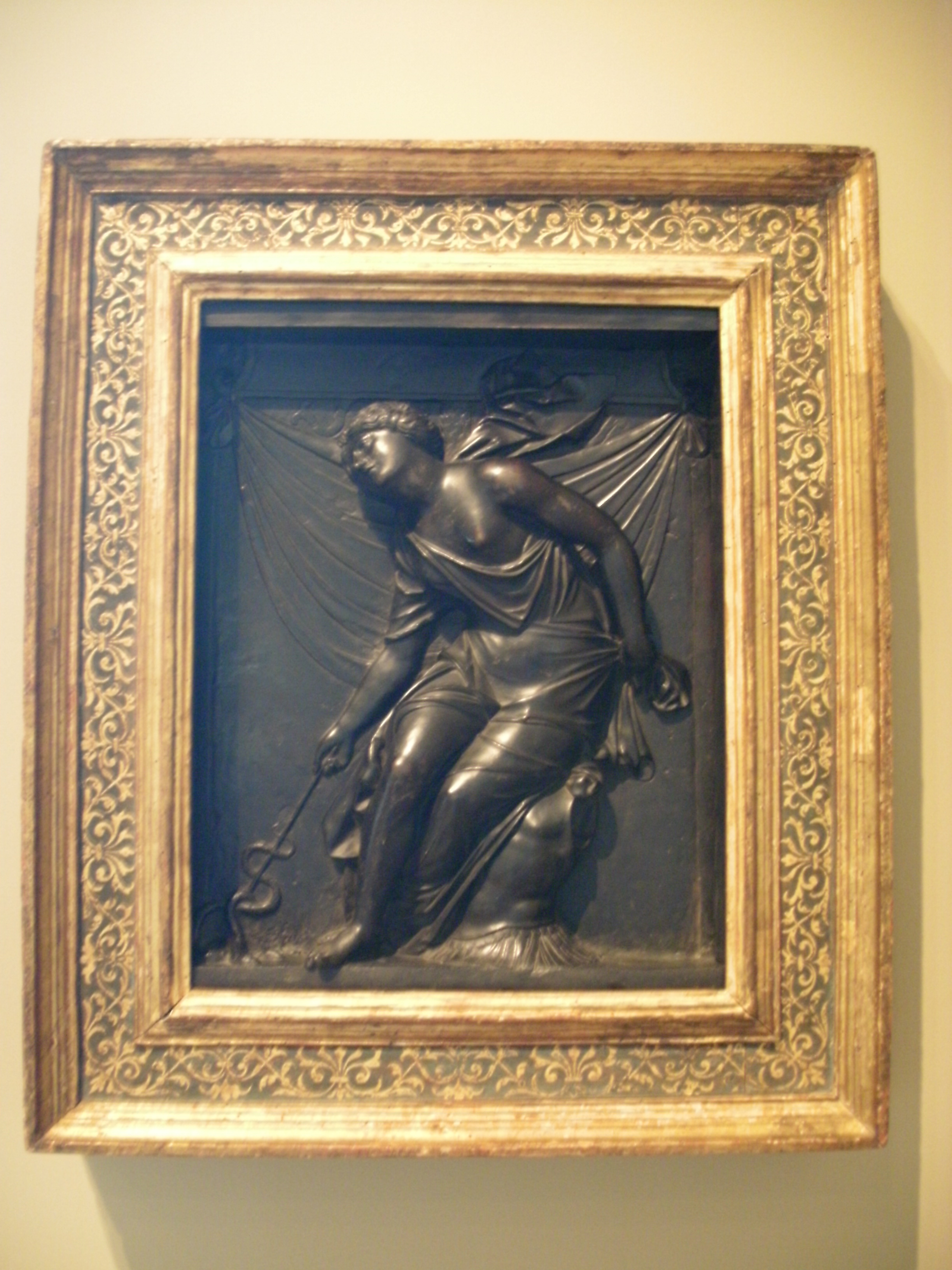
Peace Establishing her Reign, bronze of c. 1512 in the National Gallery of Art

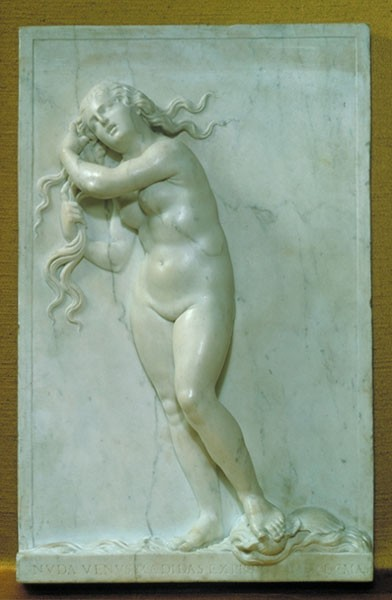
Venus Anadyomene, c.1516
