= Niccolò di Pietro =

Italian painter

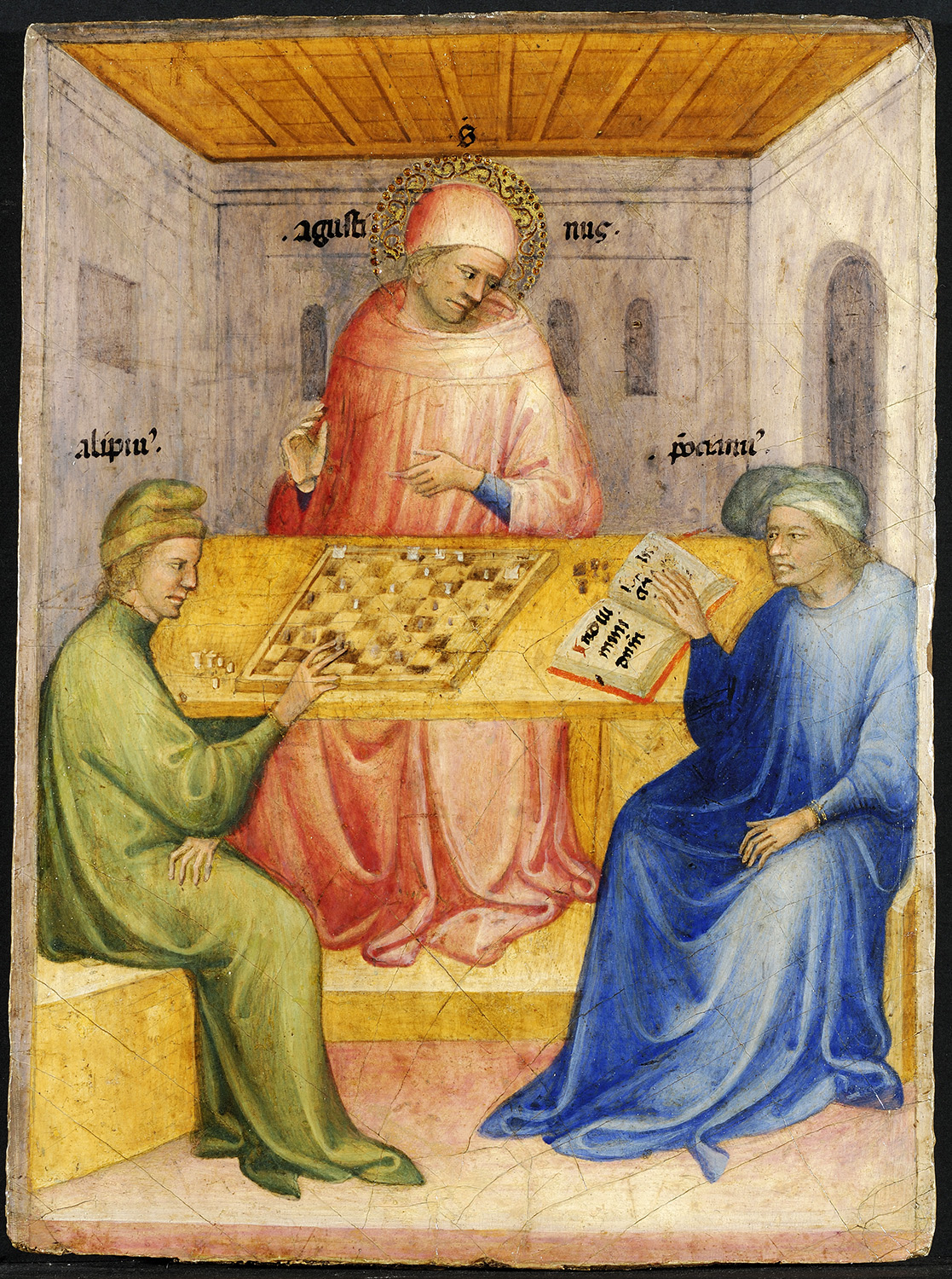
Saint Augustine and Alypius Receiving Ponticianus by Niccolò di Pietro, Museum of Fine Arts of Lyon, 1413–1415, a painting that illustrates the conversion of Augustine of Hippo

Niccolò di Pietro, also Niccolo di Pietro Veneziano or Niccolo Paradiso, (fl. late 14th century – early 15th century) was a Sienese School painter of Medieval art.

== Family life ==
In the archival documents and in inscriptions on paintings of his name can be traced from 1394 to 1430: in 1394 his name appeared on the first available date of the picture, in 1430, referred to the last time the document associated with the wedding of his daughter Antonia. For some of his work the artist signed Nicolo Paradiso, indicating that he lived in Venice near the bridge Paradiso.

Pietro belonged to an artistic dynasty that, at least in three generations played a prominent role in the artistic life in Venice. His grandfather Nicolo is referred to as an artist, his father Pietro di Niccolo mentioned in the contracts with the painters of his generation—Donato and Katarina. In recent years, more and more approved by the view that the most famous Venetian painter of the second half of the 14th century Lorenzo Veneziano was the brother of the father of the artist - Pietro di Niccolo. If this theory is correct, then Nicolo di Pietro, therefore, was the nephew of Lorenzo.

== Style and influences ==
As in the work of Lorenzo and Pietro pronounced tendency to adapt Gothic painting, the researchers believe that this family was the main promoter of the North, the Gothic influence in Venetian art. On the other hand, it can be seen in the works of Niccolo an influence of the Bolognese school, which in the 14th century by such masters as Vitale da Bologna, Tommaso da Modena and Giovanni da Bologna, was one of the leaders in the development of a more realistic and lifelike reading religious subjects. In this regard, some researchers believe that Niccolo di Pietro could be a disciple of Giovanni da Bologna, as in the will of the latter from 23 to 24 October 1389 referred to a «Nicolao suo disipulo» ("his student Nicole").

Pietro was a contemporary of the famous master Gentile da Fabriano, perhaps the best Italian artist who worked in the style of international Gothic; Gentile in 1408 to perform work in the Venetian Doge's Palace, and his refined manners could not affect the later works of Niccolo.
