= Pietro Lombardo =

Italian Renaissance sculptor and architect (1435-1515)

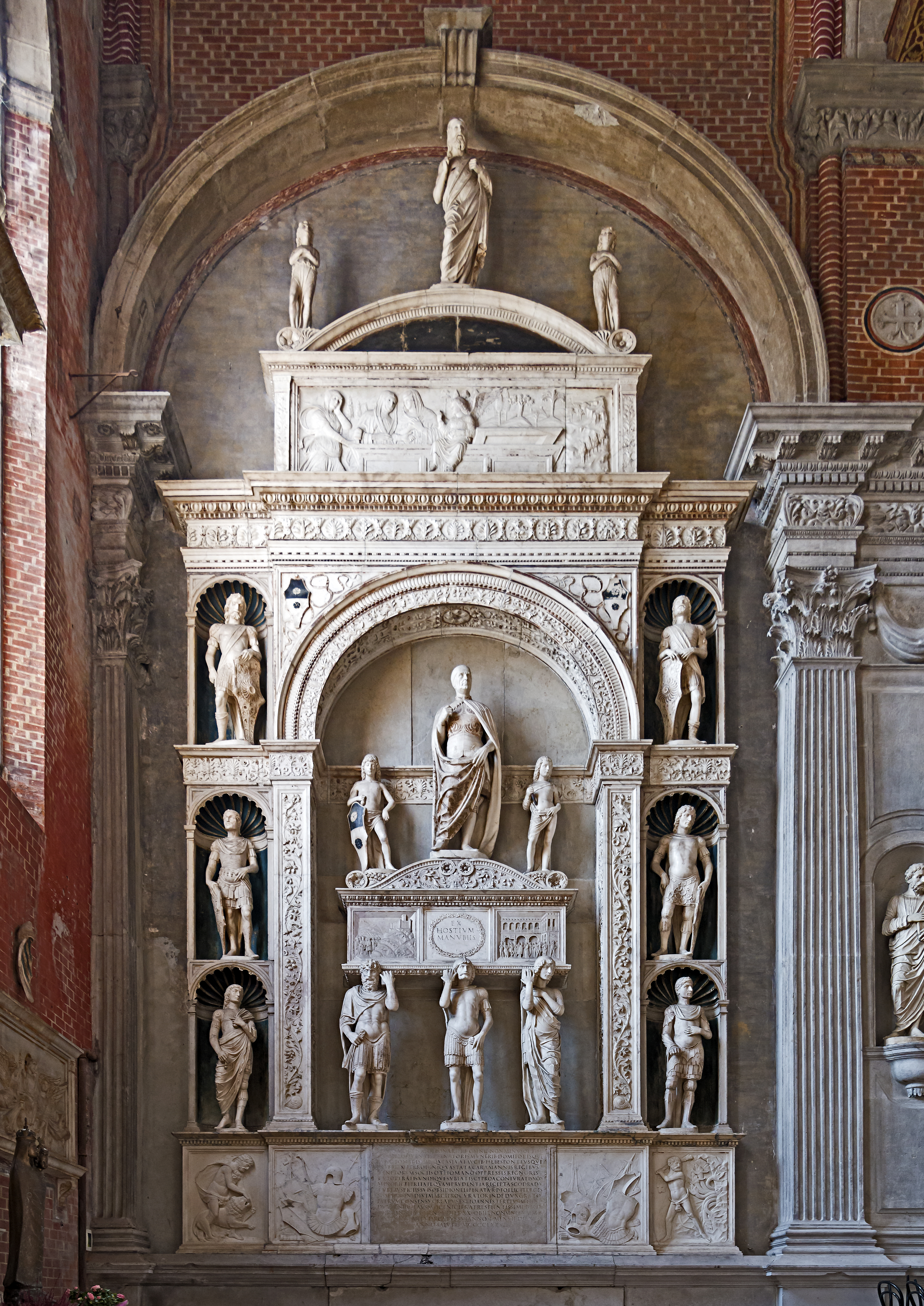
Monument of the Doge Pietro Mocenigo 1481

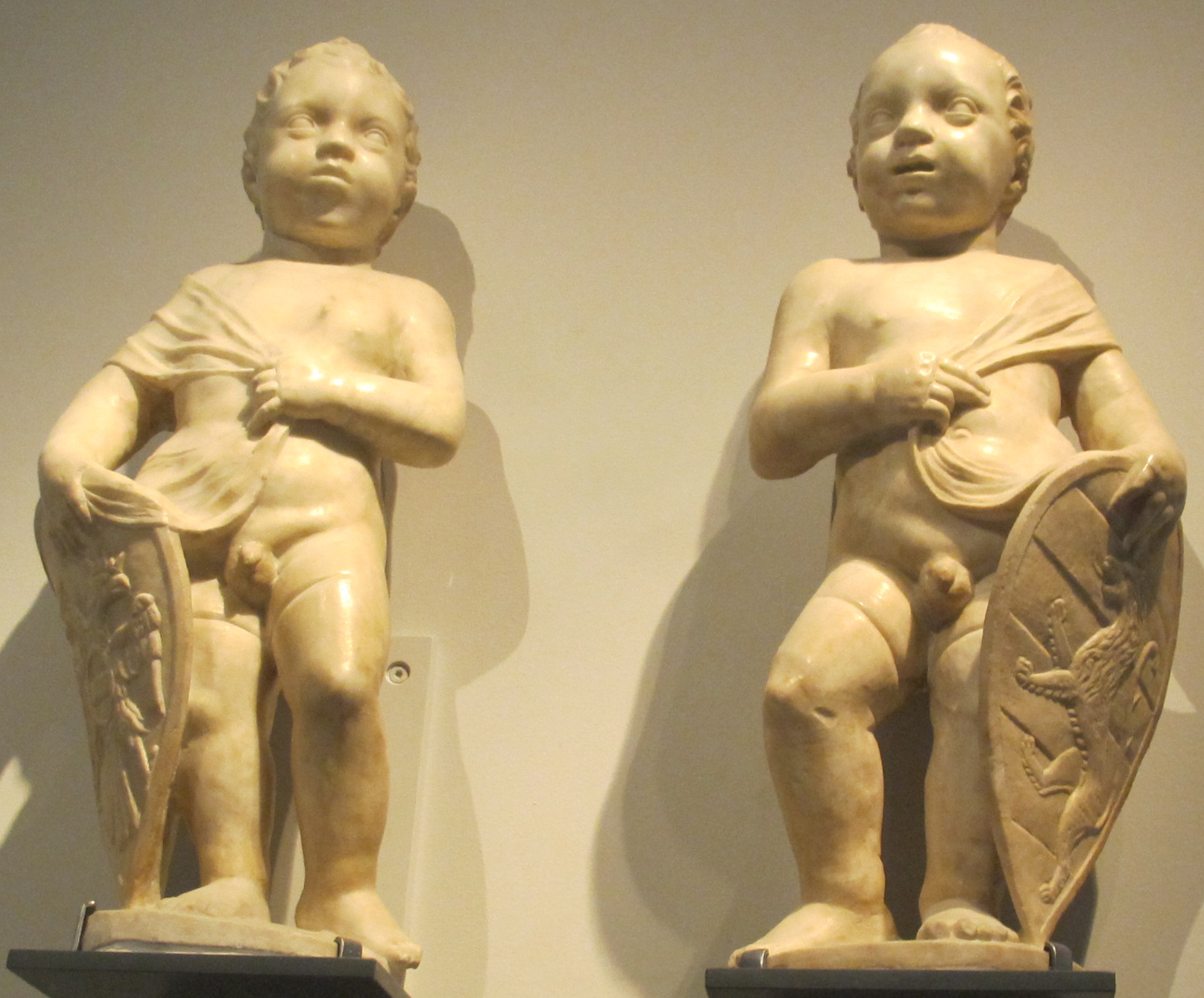
Two Putti with shields, Victoria and Albert Museum, 1500

Pietro Lombardo is also the Italian version of the name of the theologian Peter Lombard.

Pietro Lombardo (1435–1515) was an Italian Renaissance sculptor and architect; born in Carona (Ticino), he was the father of Tullio Lombardo and Antonio Lombardo.

In the late 15th century, Pietro Lombardo sculpted many Venetian tombs with the help of his sons. These tombs included those of Dante Alighieri, Doge Pasquale Malipiero and Pietro Mocenigo. He was the architect and chief sculptor for the Church of Santa Maria dei Miracoli, Venice (1481–1489) and of San Giobbe in Venice. He also depicted saints and the Virgin Mary on the walls of several Catholic churches.

Pietro Lombardo is mentioned in line 27 of Canto XLV by Ezra Pound as the first in a list of Italian renaissance artists whom Pound admired.
