= 1625 in Italy =

- Years in Italy: 1622 1623 1624 1625 1626 1627 1628
- Centuries: 16th century · 17th century · 18th century
- Decades: 1590s 1600s 1610s 1620s 1630s 1640s 1650s
- Years: 1622 1623 1624 1625 1626 1627 1628

An incomplete series of events which occurred in Italy in 1625:

== Births ==
- Giovanni Cassini, astronomer
- Pietro Bellotti, painter (d. 1700)
- Federico Cervelli, painter (d. 1700)
- Antonio Busca, painter (d. 1686)
