= 1624 in Italy =

- Years in Italy: 1621 1622 1623 1624 1625 1626 1627
- Centuries: 16th century · 17th century · 18th century
- Decades: 1590s 1600s 1610s 1620s 1630s 1640s 1650s
- Years: 1621 1622 1623 1624 1625 1626 1627

An incomplete list of events which occurred in Italy in 1624:

== Events ==
- The Action of 3 October 1624

== Births ==
- Filippo Baldinucci
- Francesco Provenzale

== Deaths ==
- Francesco Villamena
