= Fondazione Querini Stampalia =

Cultural institution in Venice

Coordinates: 45.436278°N 12.341069°E

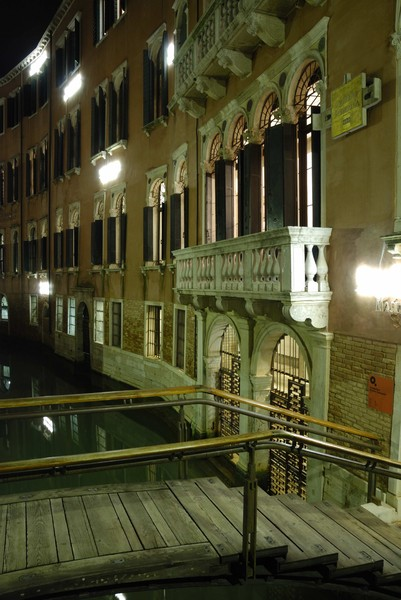
The entrance bridge to the Fondazione Querini Stampalia

The Fondazione Querini Stampalia is a cultural institution in Venice, Italy, founded in 1869 at the behest of the last descendant of the Venetian Querini Stampalia family, Conte Giovanni Querini (Count John Querini). Architect Carlo Scarpa designed interior, exterior, and garden elements and spaces on the ground floor of the historic building.

== Location ==
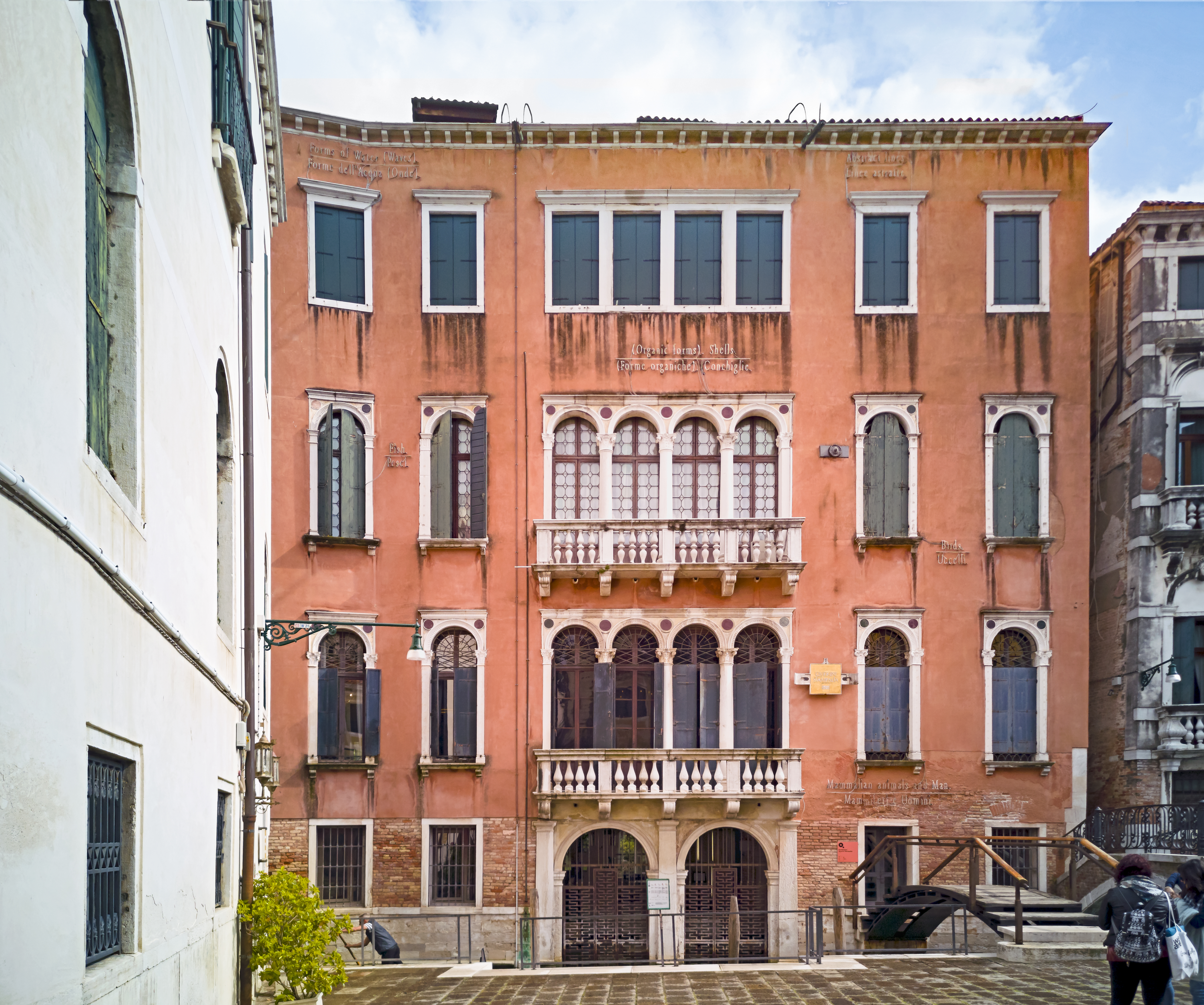
Palazzo Querini Stampalia on Campiello Querini Stampalia

The foundation is located in the Palazzo Querini Stampalia and includes living quarters, an archive, a library, and a museum of paintings and furnishings, the Pinacoteca Querini Stampalia. Located just South of the Church of Santa Maria Formosa in the sestiere Castello, the Foundation is open to the public for academic research.

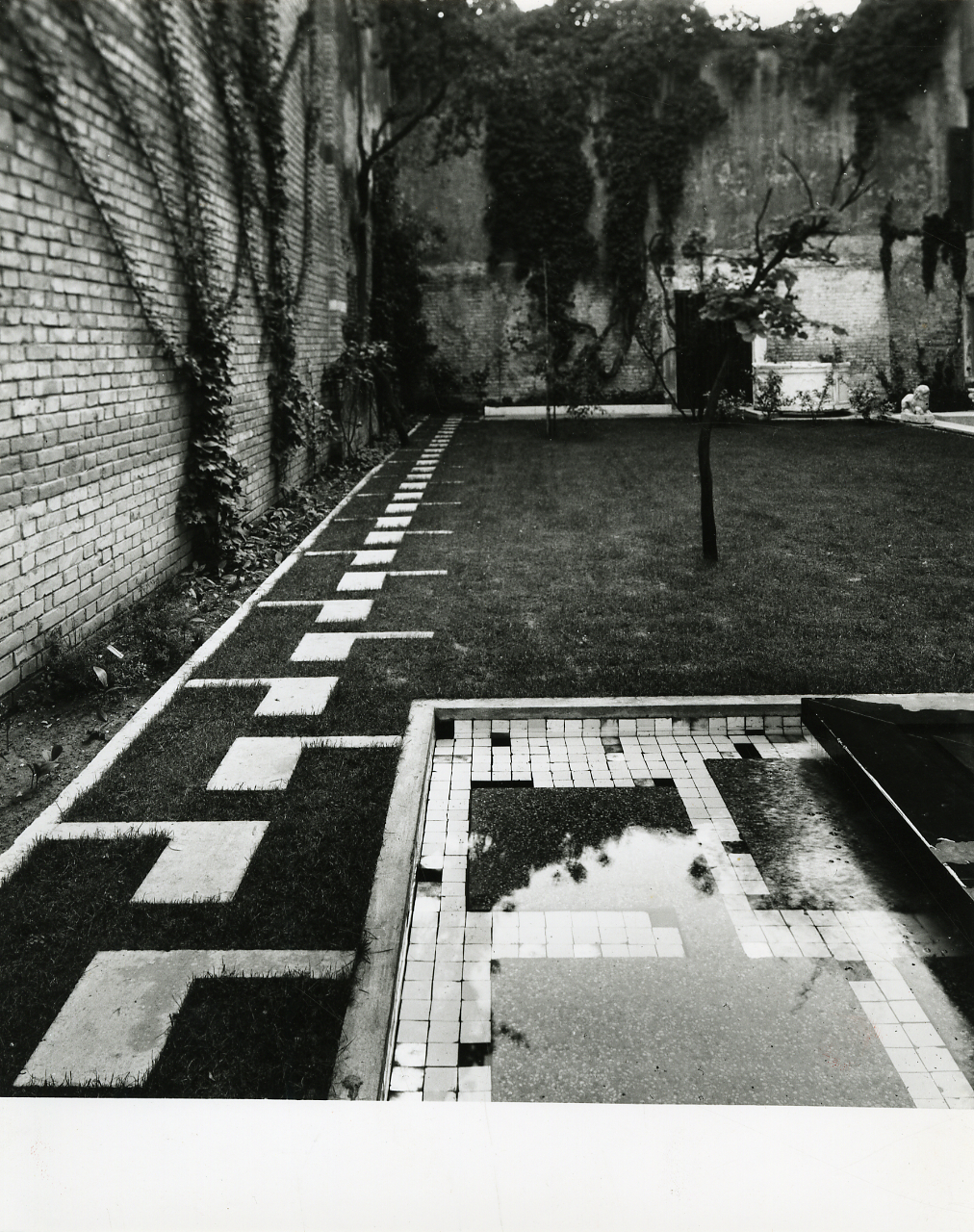
Mosaic by Mario Deluigi in the courtyard garden designed by Carlo Scarpa. Photo by Paolo Monti, 1963.

Modern restoration by Carlo Scarpa photographed by Paolo Monti in 1963

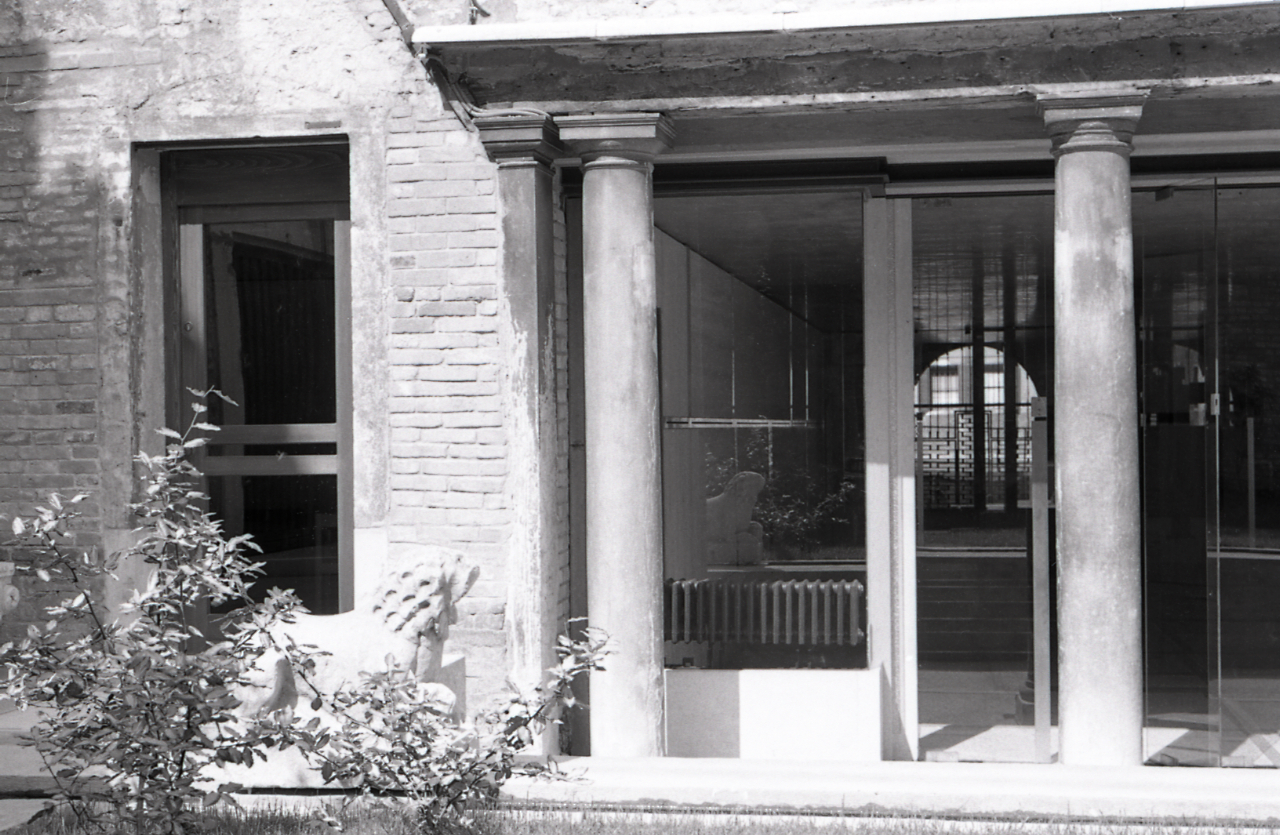
Entrance

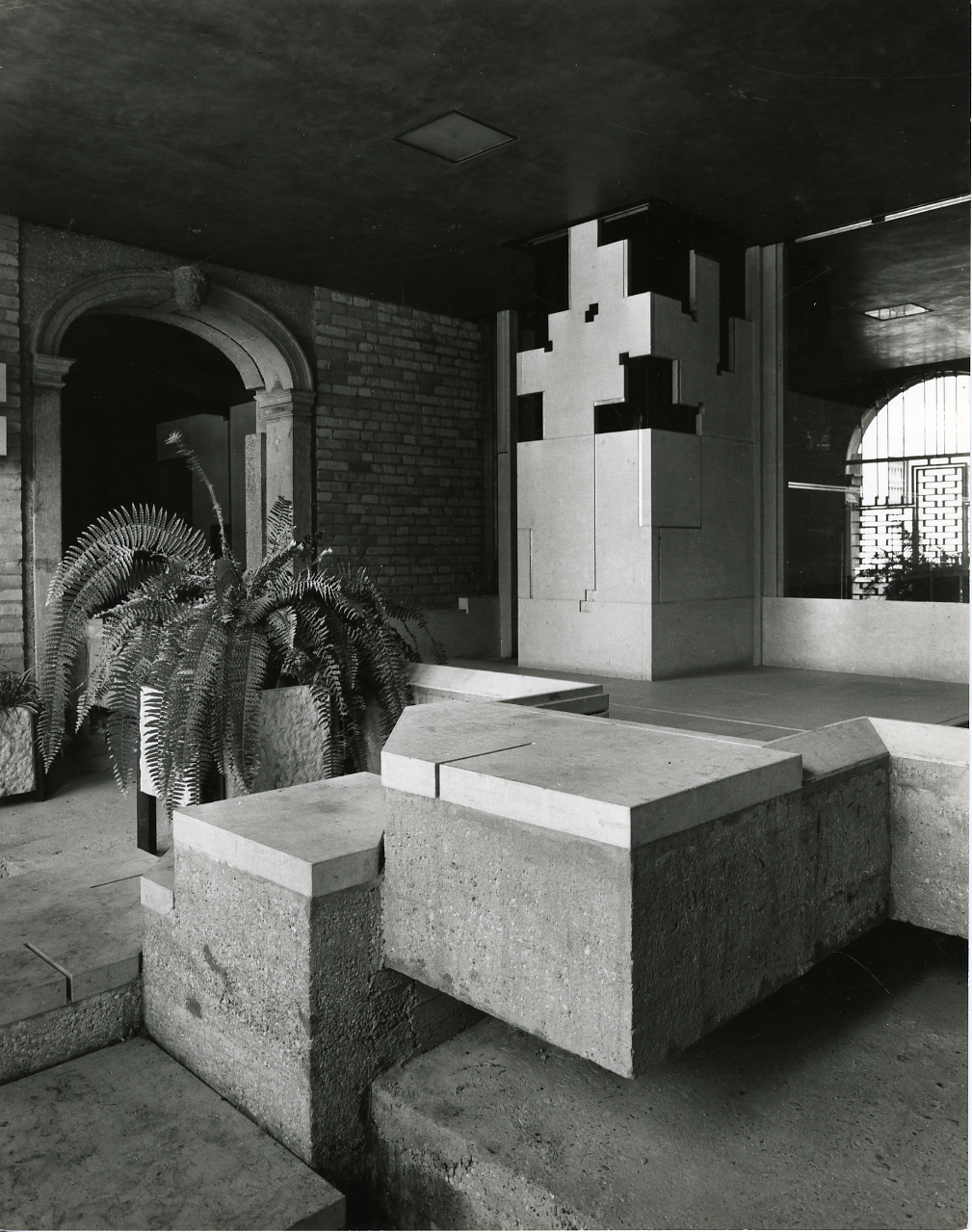
Atrium

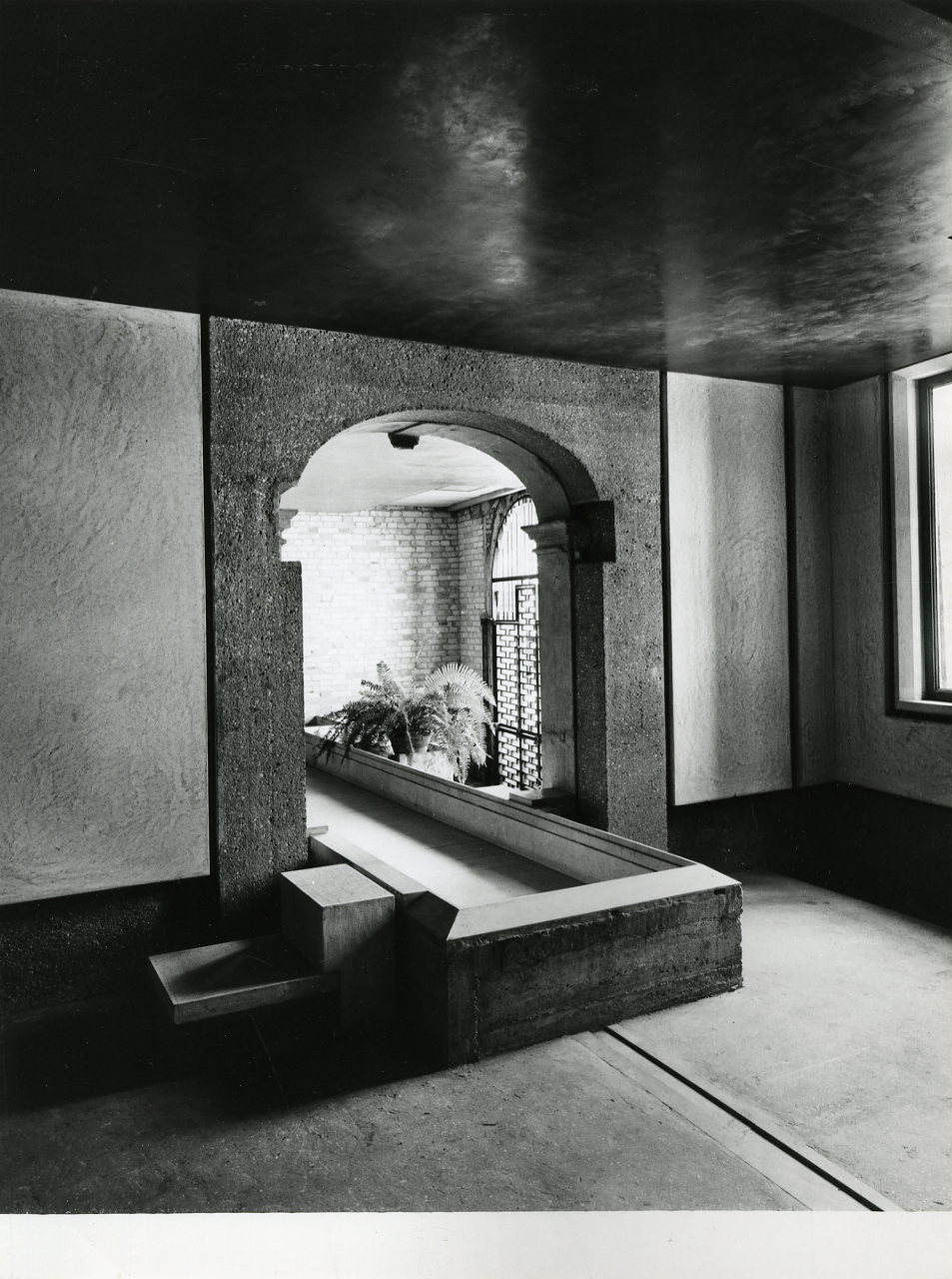
Interior

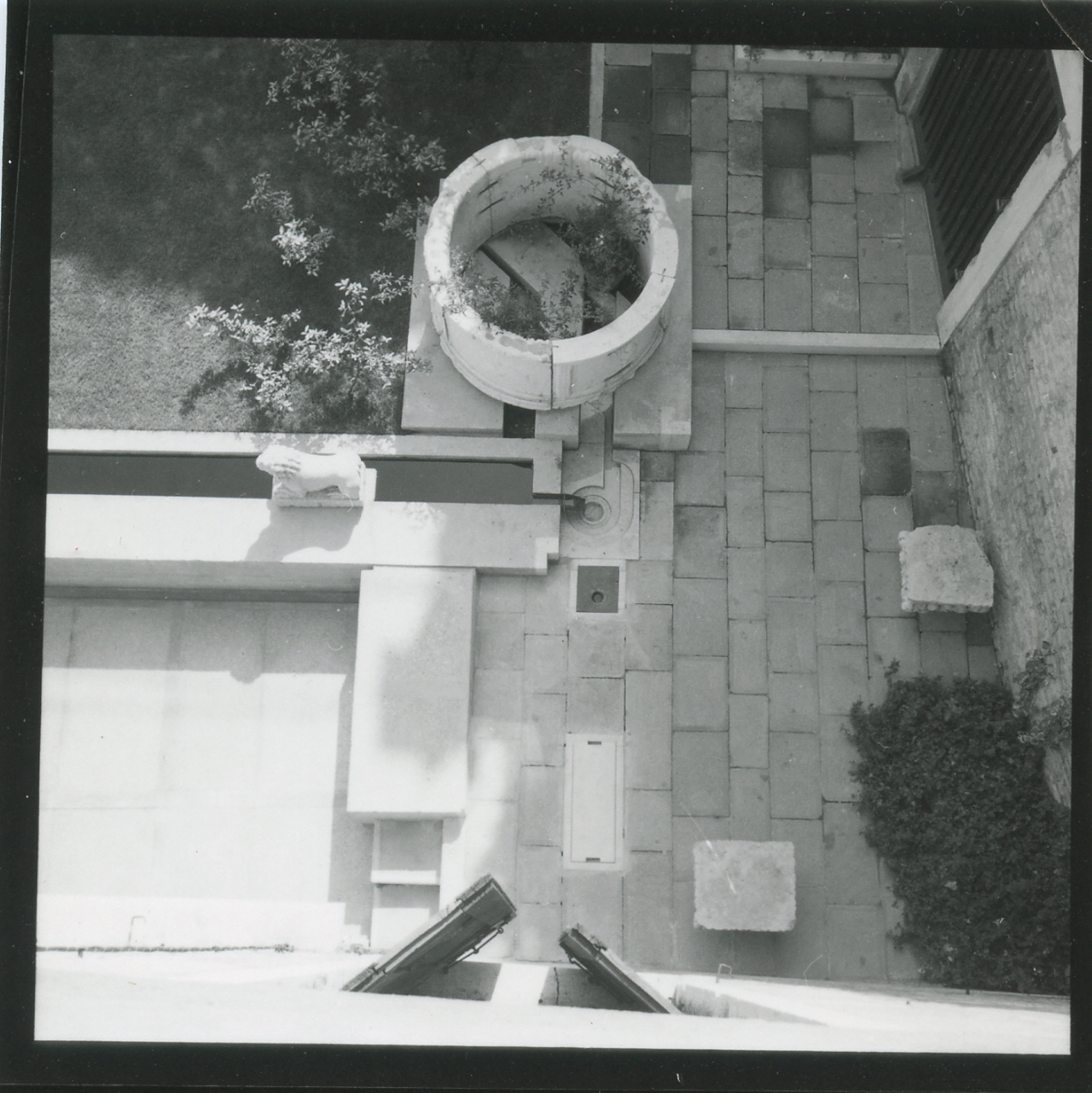
Garden

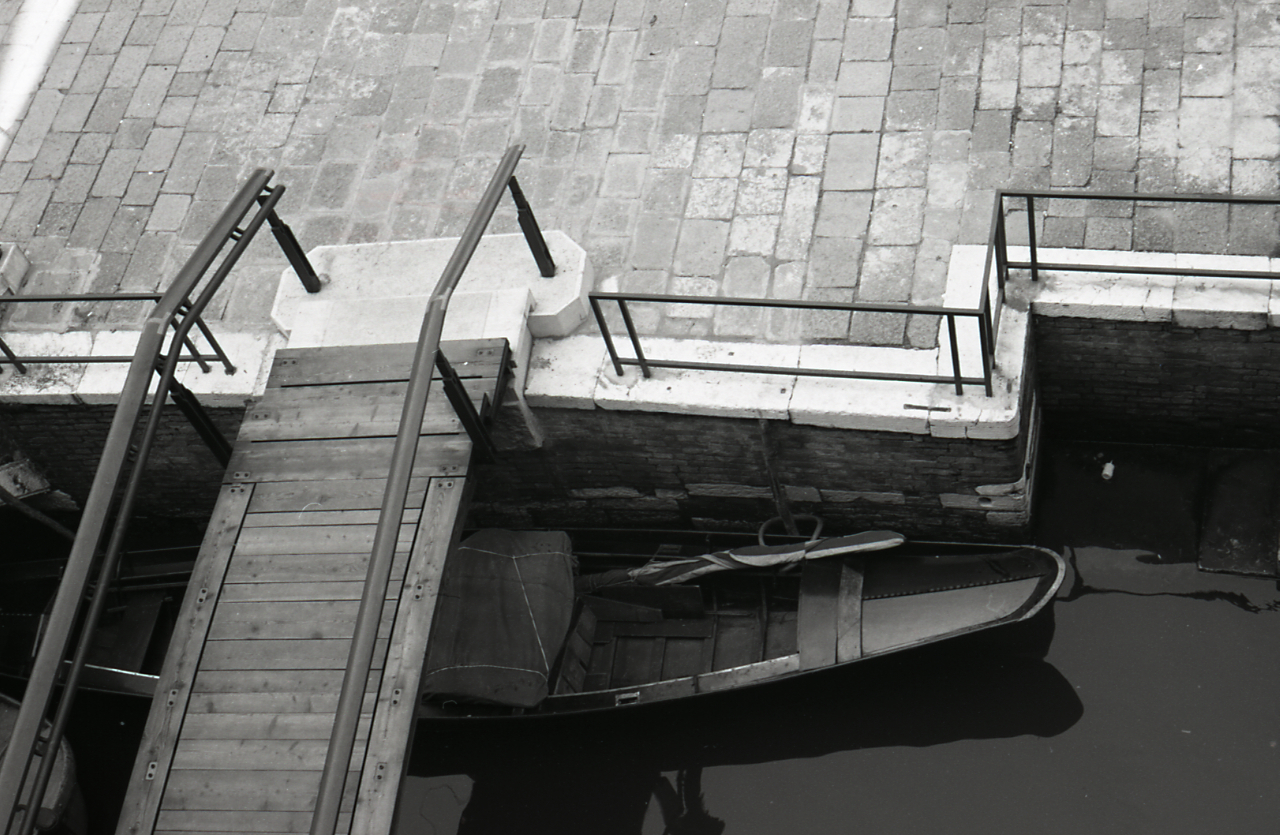
Access bridge

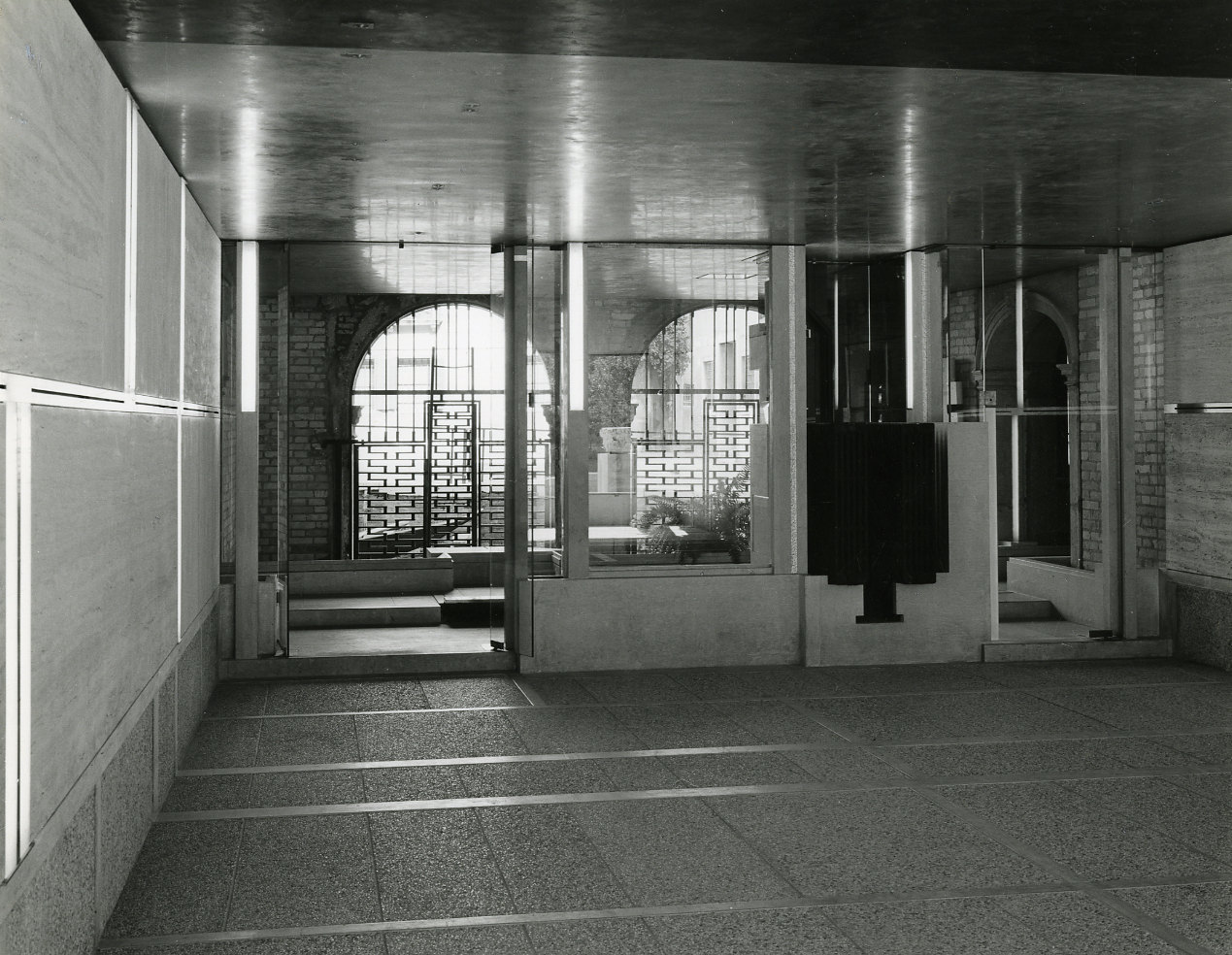
Interior. Photo by Paolo Monti, 1963

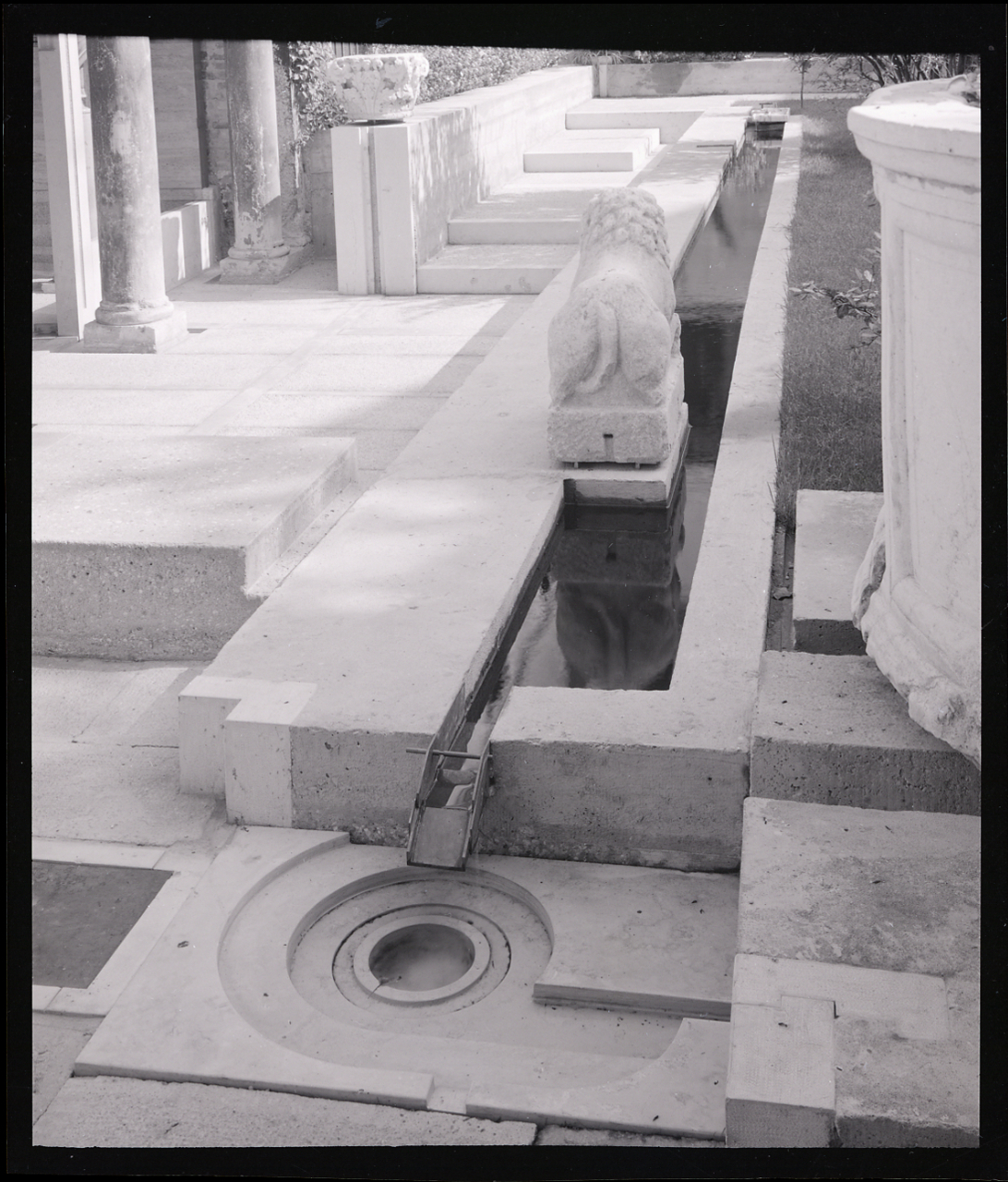
Fountain in the courtyard garden, details. Photo by Paolo Monti, 1963.

== Collections ==
The museum has a substantial art collection, specially of masterpieces of Venetian Baroque and Rococo, including paintings by Giovanni Bellini (Presentation at the Temple), Pietro Longhi, Giandomenico Tiepolo, Giulio Carpioni, Federico Cervelli, Matteo Ghidoni, Pietro and Alessandro Longhi, Pietro Muttoni, (also called della Vecchia), and Marco and Sebastiano Ricci among others. Particularly prized are the arcadian landscapes, genre scenes, and Longhi's series on the Seven Sacraments.

The museum also hosts some more modern works, including from the donation of the post-impressionist Venetian artist Eugenio Da Venezia. As well as a collection of artworks, Da Venezia gave funds to be used to build a collection of twentieth-century art representing Venice. There is also a collection of books and papers donated by the Venetian poet, Mario Stefani.

== Access ==
The Biblioteca della Fondazione Querini Stampalia, the Foundation Library, is open even on Sundays, the only one of its kind in the city, from 10 AM to 7 PM. It is considered to be one of the most beautiful public libraries in the city. Count Giovanni, in his testament in 1868, wished to ensure that the Library was open even when other libraries in the city were closed.
