= 1693 in Italy =

- Years in Italy: 1690 1691 1692 1693 1694 1695 1696
- Centuries: 16th century · 17th century · 18th century
- Decades: 1660s 1670s 1680s 1690s 1700s 1710s 1720s
- Years: 1690 1691 1692 1693 1694 1695 1696

An incomplete list of events which occurred in Italy in 1693:

- January 11 Sicily earthquake occurs
- The secret society Knights of the Apocalypse established

== Births ==
- Placido Campolo poet (died 1743)

== Deaths ==
- Count Carlo Cesare Malvasia, scholar and art historian (born 1616)
