= Cervelli =

Cervelli is an Italian surname. Notable people with this surname include:

- Federico Cervelli (1625–c. 1700), Italian painter
- Francisco Cervelli (born 1986), Italian-Venezuelan baseball player
