= 1691 in Italy =

- Years in Italy: 1688 1689 1690 1691 1692 1693 1694
- Centuries: 16th century · 17th century · 18th century
- Decades: 1660s 1670s 1680s 1690s 1700s 1710s 1720s
- Years: 1688 1689 1690 1691 1692 1693 1694

An incomplete list of events which occurred in Italy in 1691:

- 28 June, Siege of Cuneo is fought

== Births ==
- Ferdinando Ruggieri, architect (dies 1741)

== Deaths ==
- 8 February, Carlo Rainaldi, architect (born 1611)
