= 1686 in Italy =

- Years in Italy: 1683 1684 1685 1686 1687 1688 1689
- Centuries: 16th century · 17th century · 18th century
- Decades: 1650s 1660s 1670s 1680s 1690s 1700s 1710s
- Years: 1683 1684 1685 1686 1687 1688 1689

An incomplete series of events which occurred in 1686 in Italy:

== Events ==
- French attack on the Vaudois (1686) - A French attack on a Protestant community in Piedmont.

== Births ==
- Carlo Innocenzo Carlone (died 1775) - fresco painter
- Saint Ignatius of Santhiá (Laurenzo Maurizio, 1686-1770) - diocesan priest
- Benedetto Marcello (died 1739) - composer and librettist

== Deaths ==
- Antonio Busca, painter (b. 1625)
- Nicolas Steno, geologist and anatomist (born 1638)
- Carlo Dolci, Italian painter (born 1616)
