= Pinacoteca Querini Stampalia =

Art museum in Venice, Italy

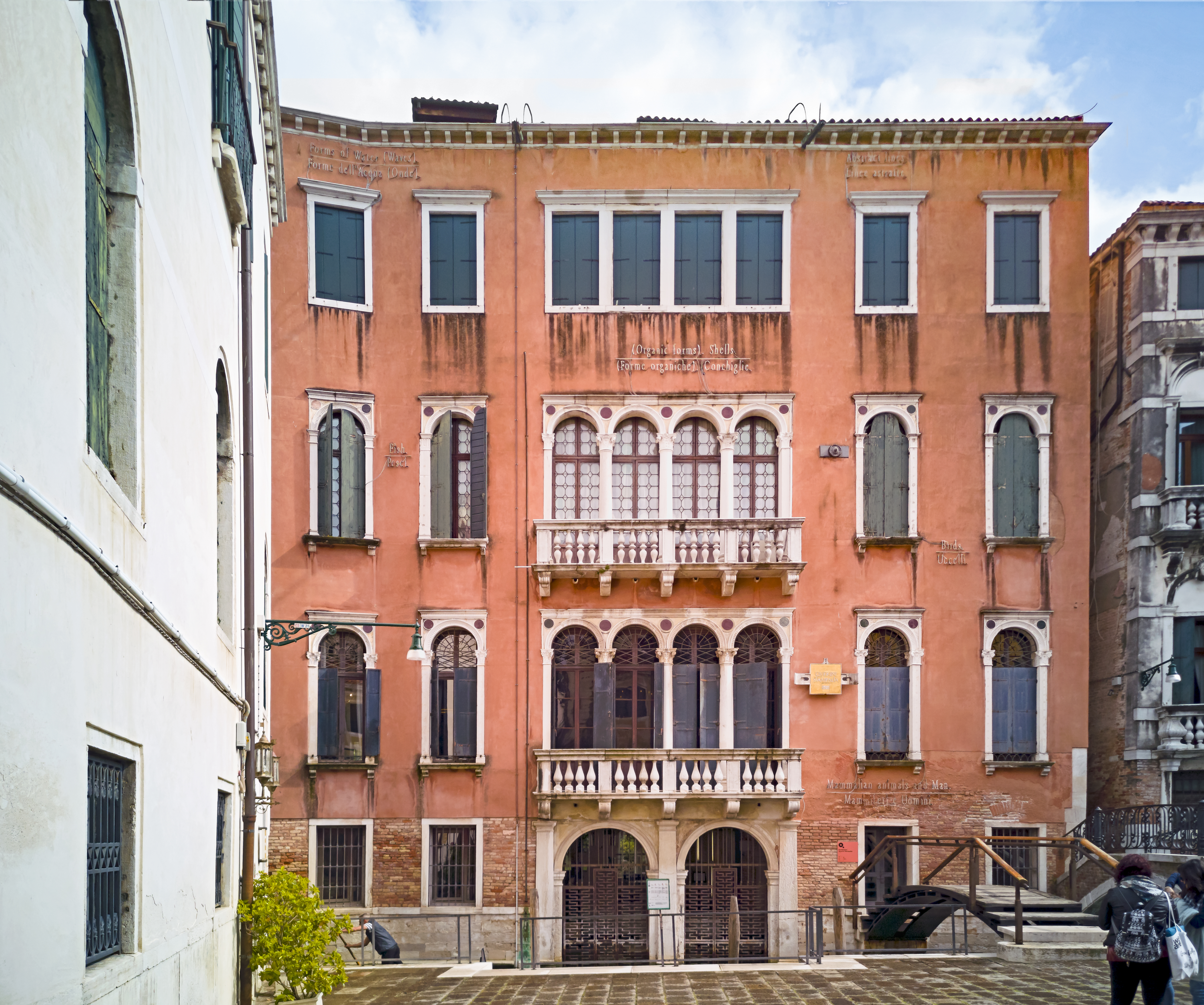
Pinacoteca Querini Stampalia

The Pinacoteca Querini Stampalia is an art collection and museum in Venice, Italy. Situated inside the Palazzo Querini Stampalia, in the sestiere of Castello, on the left bank of the Grand Canal, it includes famous paintings as a self- portrait and Adam and Eve by Palma Giovane, a Sacra Conversazione by Palma Vecchio and a Madonna and Child by Bernardo Strozzi. It also holds prized drawings by Giovanni Bellini, Raphael, Paolo Veronese, Titian, and Tintoretto.

The picture gallery is displayed within twenty rooms on the second floor of the palace which also contains furniture, a large public library, porcelains and musical instruments, along with works by artists ranging from the 14th-18th century.

== History ==
The palazzo was renovated from its original state before the 1960s. From 1961–1963, Carlo Scarpa restored parts of the building, while changing others. Scarpa created a series of islands, and allowed the water to come into the lobby space. He also restored the idea of a courtyard garden behind the building, with an abstracted rill fountain. Later additions (1993–2003) are by Mario Botta. The palace also houses the Fondazione Querini Stampalia, which sponsors a prominent library and contemporary art expositions.

== Collections ==
=== Paintings ===
Painters	Work	Date	Image
Anonymous genre painter, based on etching of Vincenzo Coronellia,	Skaters on frozen lagoon at Fondamenta Nuove in 1708		
Giovanni Bellini	Madonna & Magi		
Giulio Carpioni	Banchetto degli Dei (Banquet of the Gods)		
Annibale Carracci	Self-portrait		
Bernardino Castelli	Ritrotto di Francesco Falier		
Carlo Ceresa	Portraits		
Federico Cervelli	Pan & Siringa		
Federico Cervelli	Orfeo & Euridice		
Federico Cervelli	Warrior before architectural plans of a fortress		
Lorenzo di Credi			
Girolamo Forabosco			
Nicoló Frangipane	Baccanale (Bacchanal)		
Matteo Ghidoni (Matteo dei Pitocchi)	Zuffa di Contadini (Peasant Meal)		
Matteo Ghidoni (Matteo dei Pitocchi)	Il Medico Ciarlatano (Charlatan Doctor or Quack)		
Matteo Ghidoni (Matteo dei Pitocchi)	Festa Campestre Presso un Castello (Peasants celebrate near castle)		
Matteo Ghidoni (Matteo dei Pitocchi)	Festa Campestre Presso una Casa (Peasants celebrate near house)		
Luca Giordano	Leucippo & Democritus		
Giovan Battista Langetti	Diogenes & Alexander		
Pietro Longhi	Il Ridotto	1757-60	
Pietro Longhi	La furlana (Dance of the Furlana)	c. 1750-55	
Pietro Longhi	La famiglia Sagredo (The Sagredo family)	c. 1752	
Pietro Longhi	La lezione di geografia (Geography Lesson)	c. 1750-52	
Pietro Longhi	Sette Sacramenti (7 Sacraments: Baptism, Ordination, Confession, Confirmation, Communion, Marriage, & Extreme Unction	1755-57	
Pietro Longhi	La frateria di Venezia (Seminary)	1761	
Pietro Longhi	Le tentazioni di Sant'Antonio (Temptations of St. Anthony)	1761	
Pietro Longhi	Il casotto del leone (Circus)	1762	
Pietro Longhi	Scene di cacci (Hunting Scenes)	1765-60	
Pietro Longhi	La famiglia Michiel (Michiel family portrait	c. 1780	
Andrea Medulich (Il Schiavone)	Conversione Di S. Paolo (Conversion of Saint Paul)		
Bartolomeo Nazari	Portrait of Cardinal Angelo Maria Querini		
Palma il Vecchio	Portraits		
Palma il Giovane	Portrait		
Palma il Giovane	Donato and Caterino		
Marco Ricci	Three rustic landscapes		
Marco Ricci	Armelina		
Marco Ricci	Portrait of a gentleman		
Francesco Rizzo da Santacroce	L'adorazione Dei Magi (Adoration by Magi)		
Antonio Stom (attributed)	La partenza del Bucintoro (Departure of the Bucintoro)	1729	
Antonio Stom (attributed)	La Guerra Dei Pugni (Fist-fight on a bridge)		
Matthias Stom	Military Camp		
Bernardo Strozzi	Madonna Col Bambino		
Alessandro Varotari (Il Padovanino)	La Giusticia e la Pace (Allegory of Justice & Peace)		
Giambattista Tiepolo	Portrait of a Dolfin Procuratore & General of the Sea(?)		
Michele Giambono (or Titian)	Allegory of Justice and Peace		
Cassana			
Sebastiano Ricci	Allegories of Dawn, Noon, & Night	c.1698	
Pietro della Vecchia (Pietro Muttoni).	Four idyllic landscapes (Passeggiata, Concerto, Incontro e Congedo degli amanti)		

=== Sculptures ===
Name	Image	Titre(s)	Date
Antonio Canova		Modulo forLaetitia Bonaparte	
Giacomo Cassetti		Cardinal Angelo Maria Querini	between 1727 and 1730
Michele Fabris		A Philosopher	between 1674 and 1681
Michele Fabris		A Philosopher head covered	between 1674 and 1681
Michele Fabris		Bust of St. John the Baptist	between 1674 and 1681
Michele Fabris		Young pupil	between 1674 and 1681
Michele Fabris		Saint John the Evangelist	between 1674 and 1681
Michele Fabris		Philosopher with the bare shoulder	between 1674 and 1681
Michele Fabris		Philosopher in the headgear	between 1674 and 1681
