= 1616 in Italy =

An incomplete series of events which happened in Italy in 1616:

- Action of 29 April 1616
- The Church of St. Teresa is built in Turin

== Births ==
- Count Carlo Cesare Malvasia (died 1693)
- Anna Gonzaga (died 1684)
- Carlo Dolci (died 1686)
- Bernardo Cavallino (died 1656)
- Giacomo Castelvetro (born 1546)
- Luigi Pellegrini Scaramuccia (died 1680)
- Pierfrancesco Cittadini (died 1681)
- Giovan Antonio de' Rossi, architect (died 1695)
- March Maurizio Cazzati, composer (died 1678)
- Juan Bautista Antonelli, military engineer (born 1547)

== Deaths ==
- Matteo Perez d'Aleccio
- Matthia Ferrabosco
- Bernardino Realino
