= Michele Fabris =

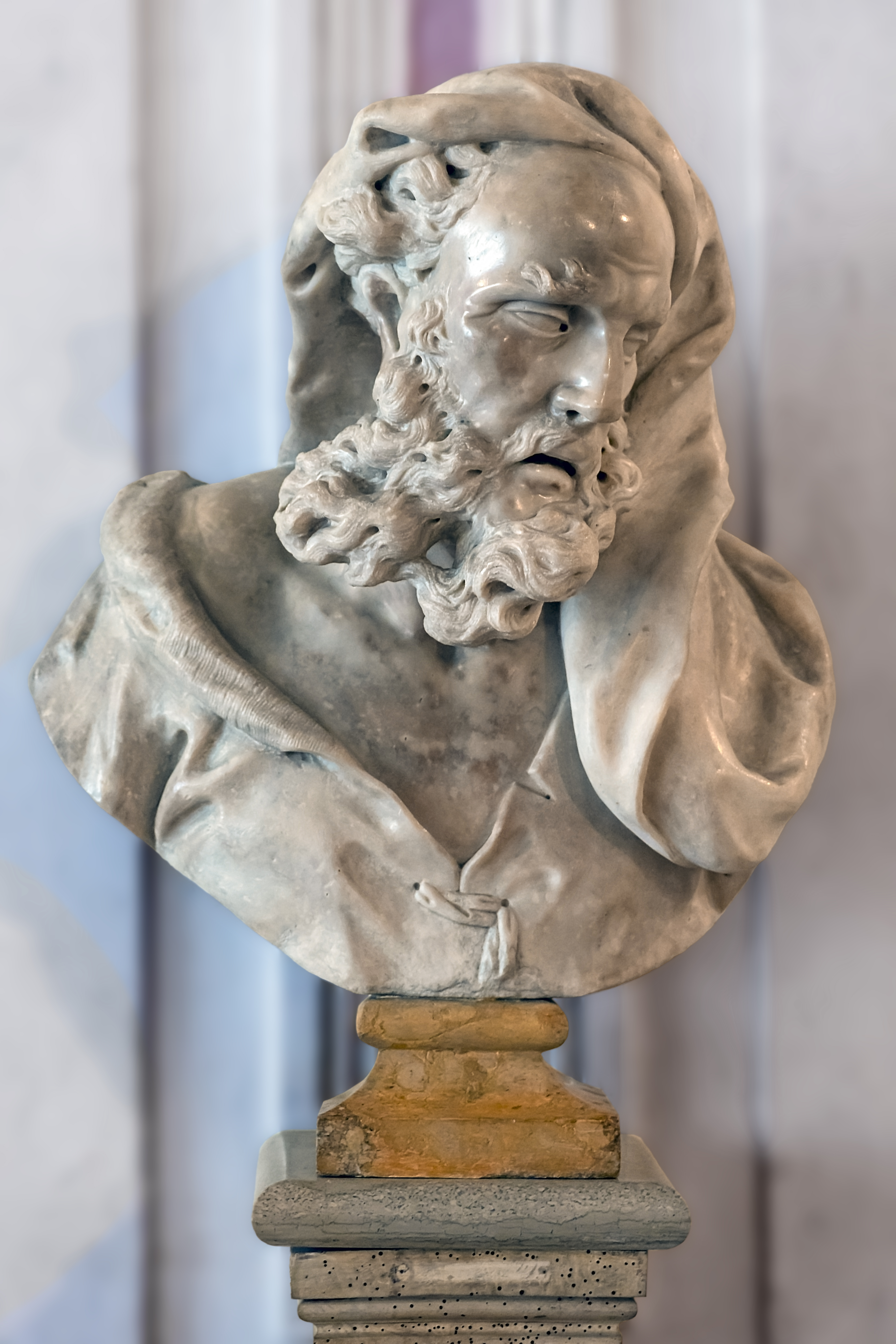
A philosopher, head covered - Fondazione Querini Stampalia Venice

Michele Fabris (1644 – 8 July 1684) was a Baroque sculptor, born in Hungary, but mainly active in Venice and Padua. A series of busts at the Querini Stampalia Museum, previously attributed to Orazio Marinali, are now attributed to him. Due to his Hungarian origins, he is also referred to as l'Ongaro.
