= Santa Maria dei Servi, Padua =

Church in Padua, Veneto, Italy

Coordinates: 45°24′16.6″N 11°52′32.63″E

Santa Maria dei Servi
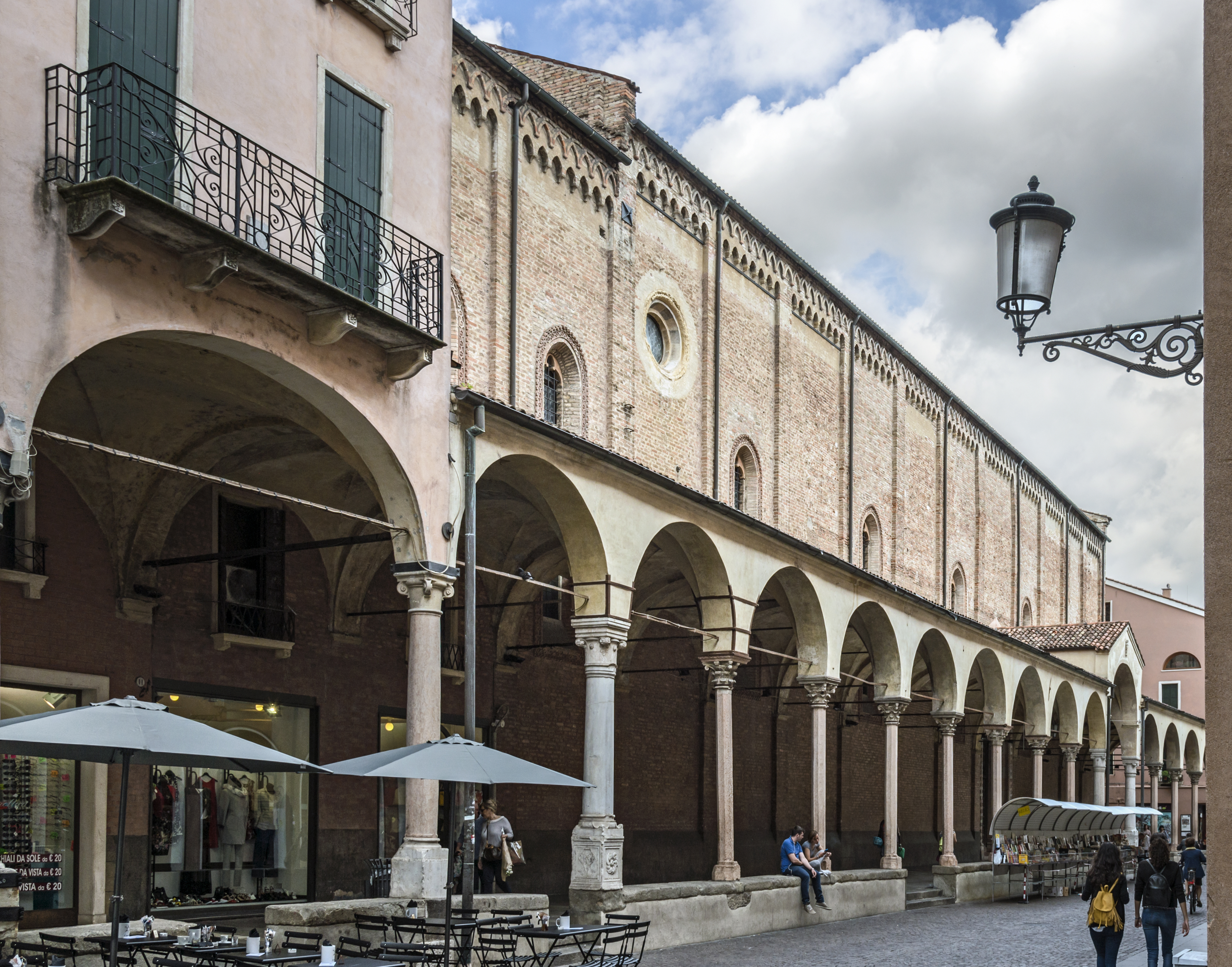
- Via Roma facade

Religion
- Affiliation: Roman Catholic
- Rite: Roman rite
- Year consecrated: 1511

Location
- Location: Italy
- Interactive map of Santa Maria dei Servi

Architecture
- Type: Church
- Style: Lombard, Gothic

Specifications
- Direction of façade: N
- Length: 57 metres (187 ft)
- Width (nave): 17 metres (56 ft)

Santa Maria dei Servi, or simply known as the Chiesa dei Servi, or more fully as the Church of the Nativity of the Servants of the Blessed Virgin Mary, is a 14th-century, Roman Catholic church that faces the Via Roma in Padua, region of the Veneto, Italy. This is a parish church in the vicariate of the Cathedral Basilica of Santa Maria Assunta governed by the Servite Order (order of the Servants of Mary). The church contains outstanding works of art including a wooden crucifix by Donatello.

== History ==
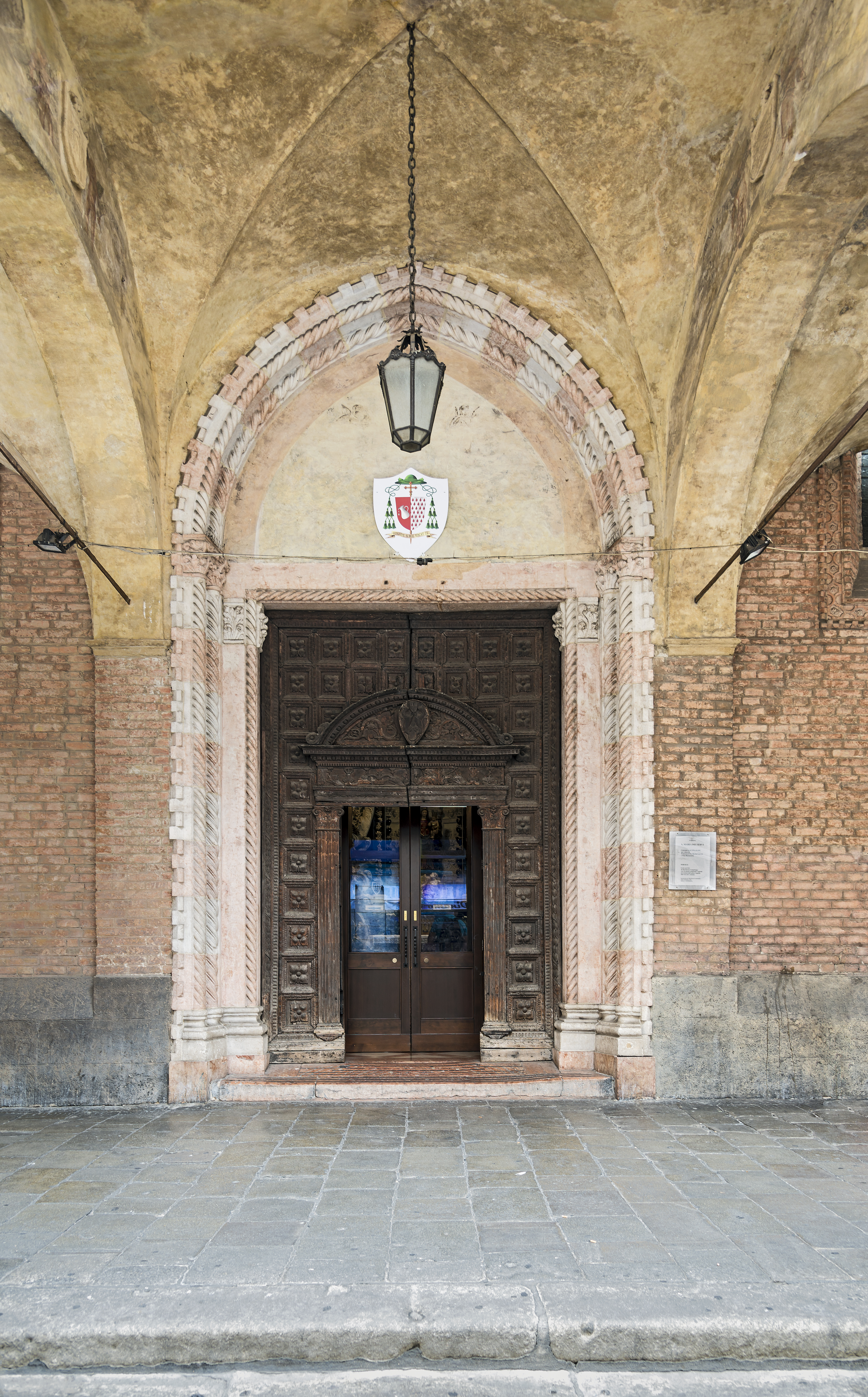
Gothic portal of the 14th century

Construction of the church between 1372 and 1390 was financed by Fina Buzzaccarini, wife of the Prince of Padua, Francesco I da Carrara. The building was built on the site of the razed palace of Nicholas Carrara, who in 1327 betrayed Francesco by conspiring with Cangrande I della Scala. After the death of Fina in 1378, the task of completing the construction of the church was left to her sister Anna, abbess of the monastery of St Benedict. In 1393 Francesco Novello da Carrara, son of Fina and lord of Padua gave the church to the Servites.

The church was part of a convent complex which included the convent of the Servants of Mary, and the Oratory of Sant'Omobono. The convent was home to Fra Paolo Sarpi. The convent was demolished in the 1950s.

In 1807 the Servite Fathers were expelled by Napoleon and the church was confiscated and forfeited as state assets. It was established as a parish church, run by secular clergy. In 1927 the interior of the church was restored to the austere 14th-century appearance. The building was reconsecrated in 1963.

In June 2014, the Bishop of Padua accepted the request of the Superior of the Order of Servants of Mary to be able to return to their historic church after 207 years of administration by the secular clergy. The delivery was on 6 September of the same year. The churches of San Canciano and San Luca are now subsidiaries to this church. For a period the churches of San Zilio and Santa Giuliana were also subsidiaries, until they were closed.

The following are entombed inside the church: Count Emilio Campolongo, and Doimo Olzignani.

== Architecture ==
The Gothic style building is oriented north - south, parallel to the street. The façade supported by pilasters and arches, juts out on a short square; it opens an elegant portal Gothic-Lombard style in Vicenza stone with an oculus window atop. The arcade covers a 1510 porch by Bartolomeo Campolongo. The 10 octagonal columns were re-utilized from a 14th-century chapel in the nearby Basilica of St. Anthony of Padua. On the porch there is a large Gothic portal (last decades of the 14th century), made from blocks of white and red marble. The 15th-century wooden doors are carved in the Lombard Romanesque style. Along the wall between pilasters and arches opening single-light trefoil. The apse is hidden by the surrounding buildings.

Above the door of the sacristy is a bronze monument by Andrea Riccio dedicated to Paolo and Angelo De castro, jurists.

The 14th century bell tower rises above the chapel on the right side, supported on pilasters and arches. The belfry is illuminated by Gothic windows. During the 2004 restoration, the bell mechanism was electrified.

== Interior ==
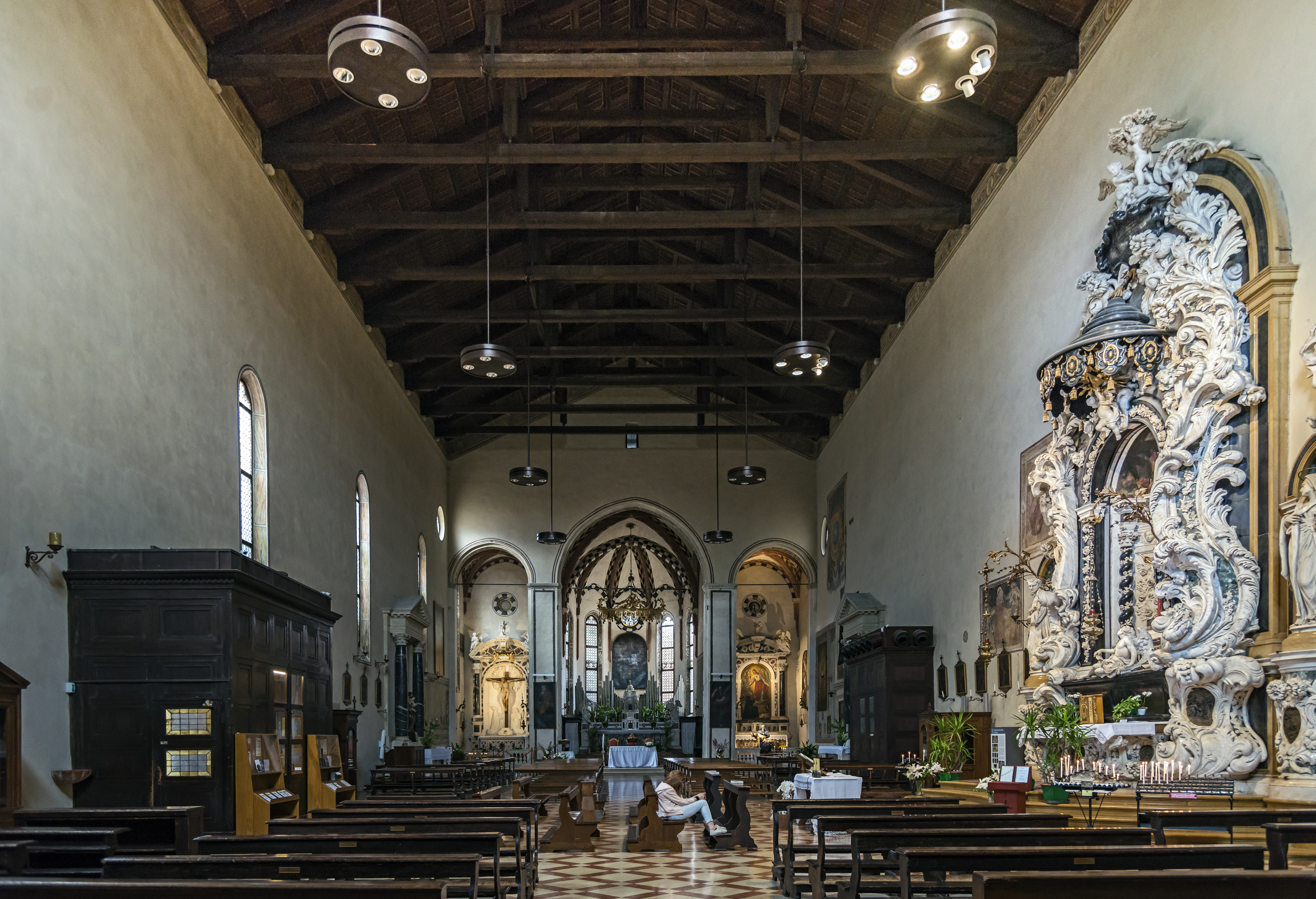
View of the interior of the church.

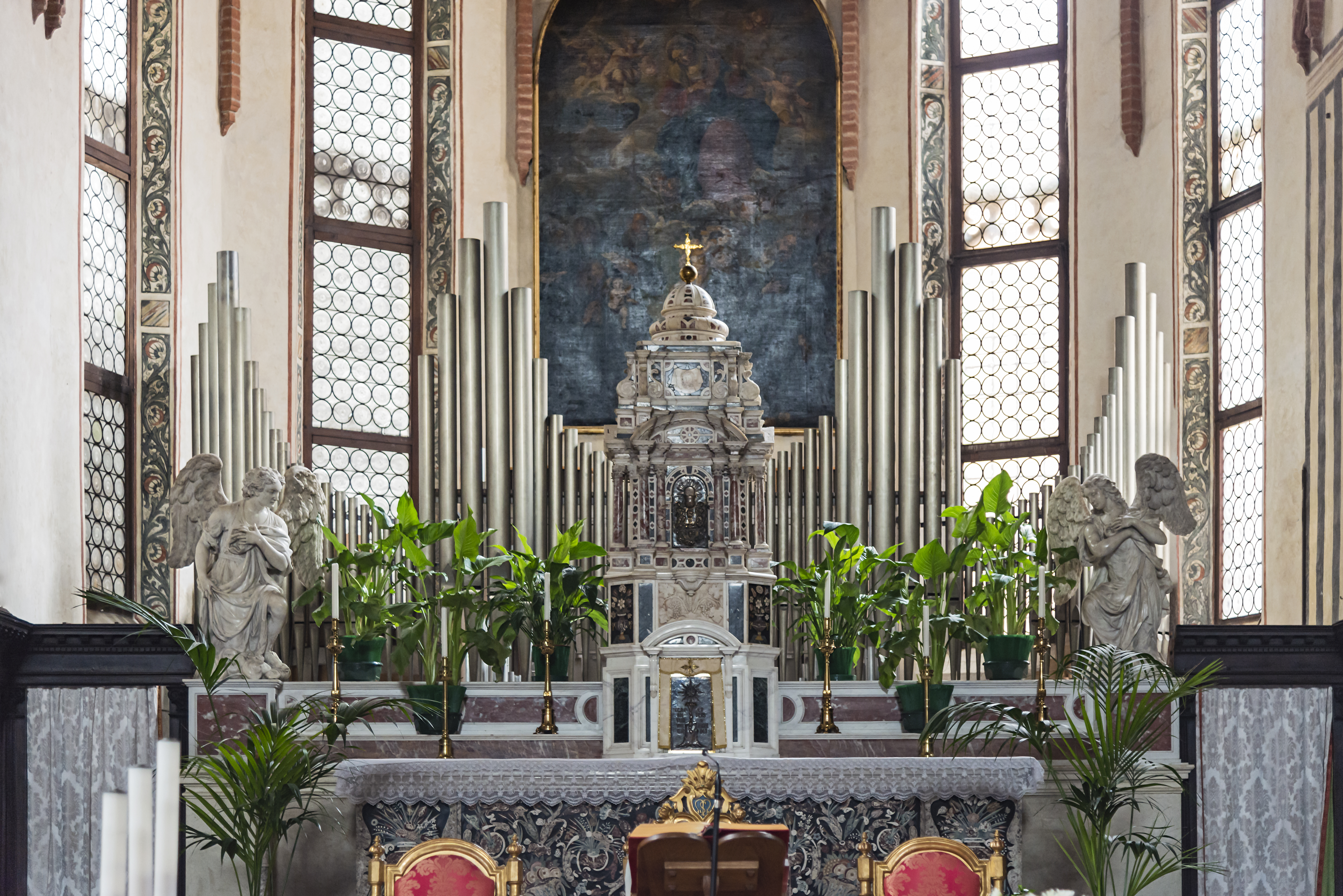
17th-century choir.

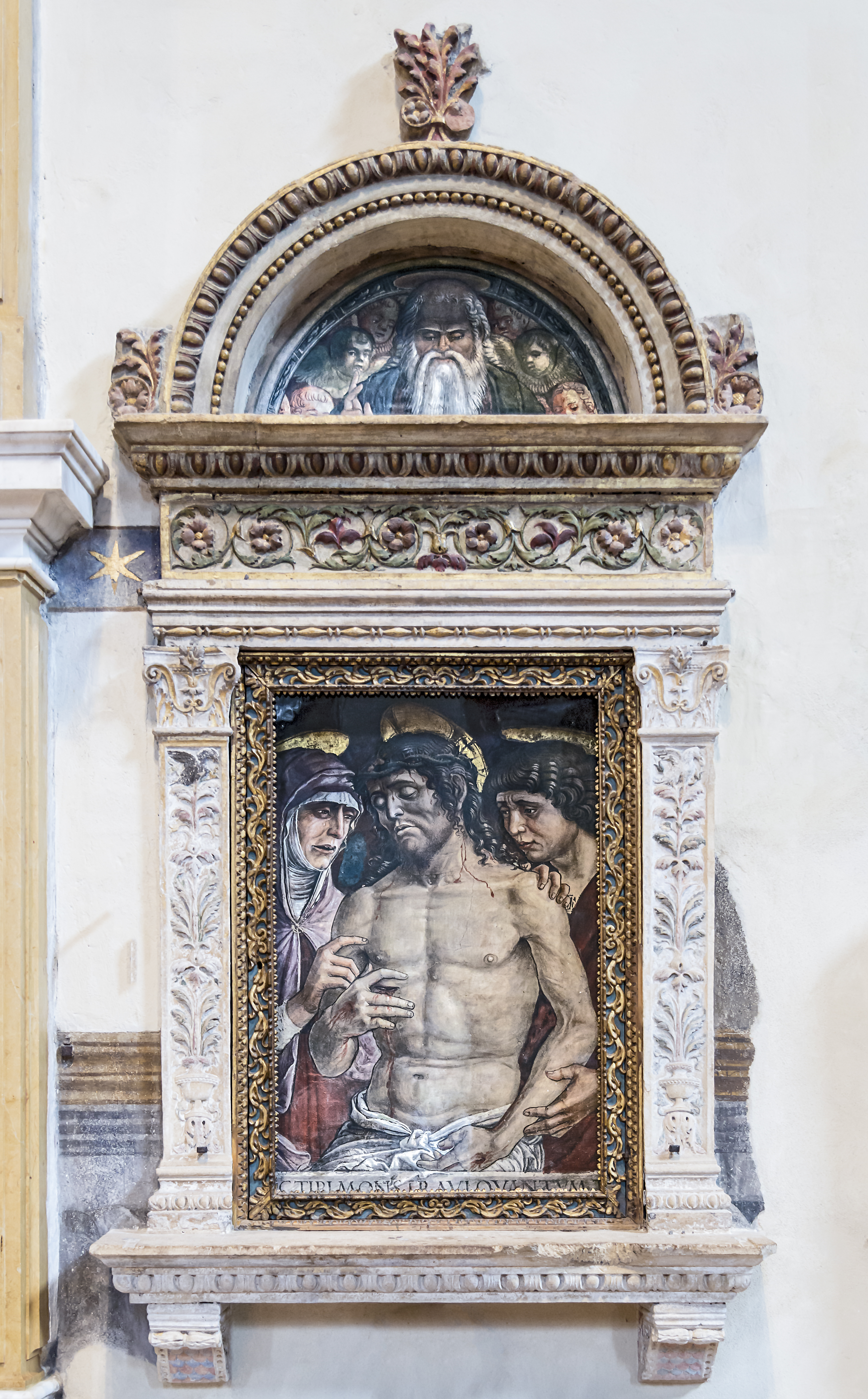
Deposition by Jacopo Parisati da Montagnana

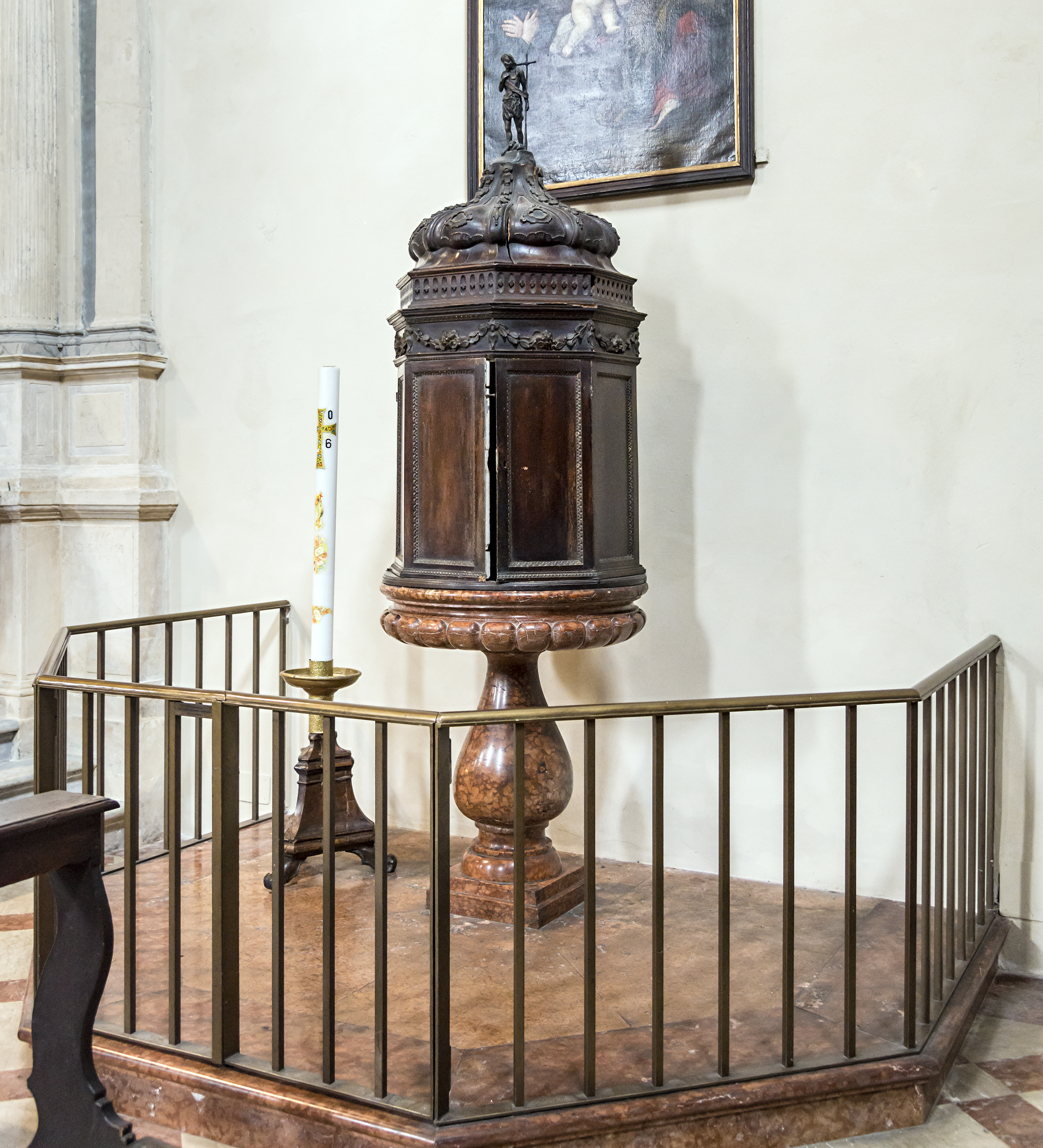
Baptismal font

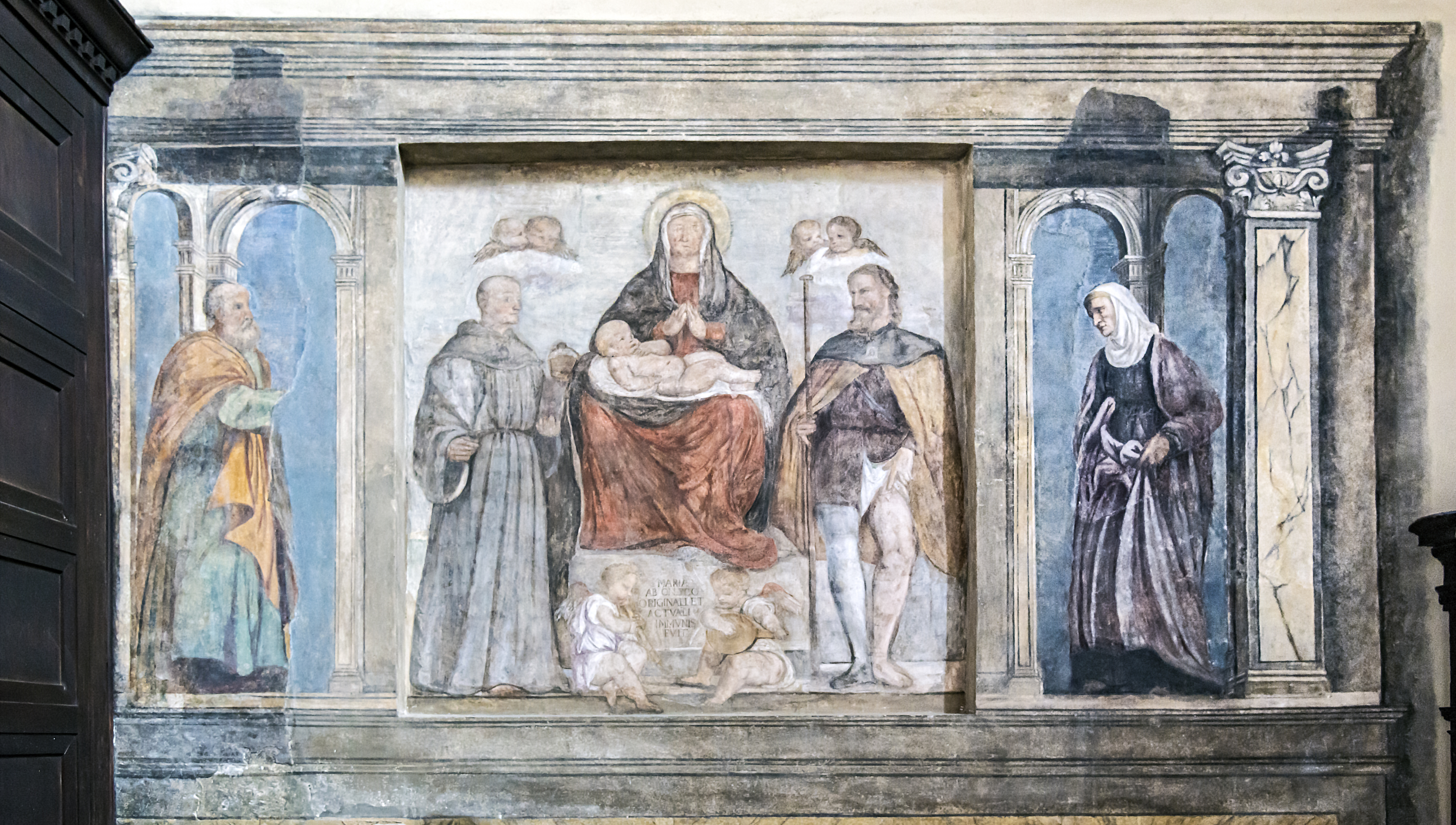
Virgin and Child, St Anne, and young John the Baptist by Girolamo Tessari.

On the sides of the main altar are two chapels, dedicated - on the right - to the Sacred Heart of Jesus and - on the left - to Donatello's miraculous cross. In the sacristy is an Addolorata by Ludovico Dorigny.

=== Altare dell'Addolorata ===
Opposite the entrance stands a monumental Baroque altar dedicated to Our Lady of Sorrows. The rococo altar decoration was designed by the sculptor Rinaldino di Francia. The flanking marble statues (1710) of Saints Philip and Juliana were sculpted by Antonio Bonazza. The central statue of the virgin is by an unknown 15th-century sculptor.

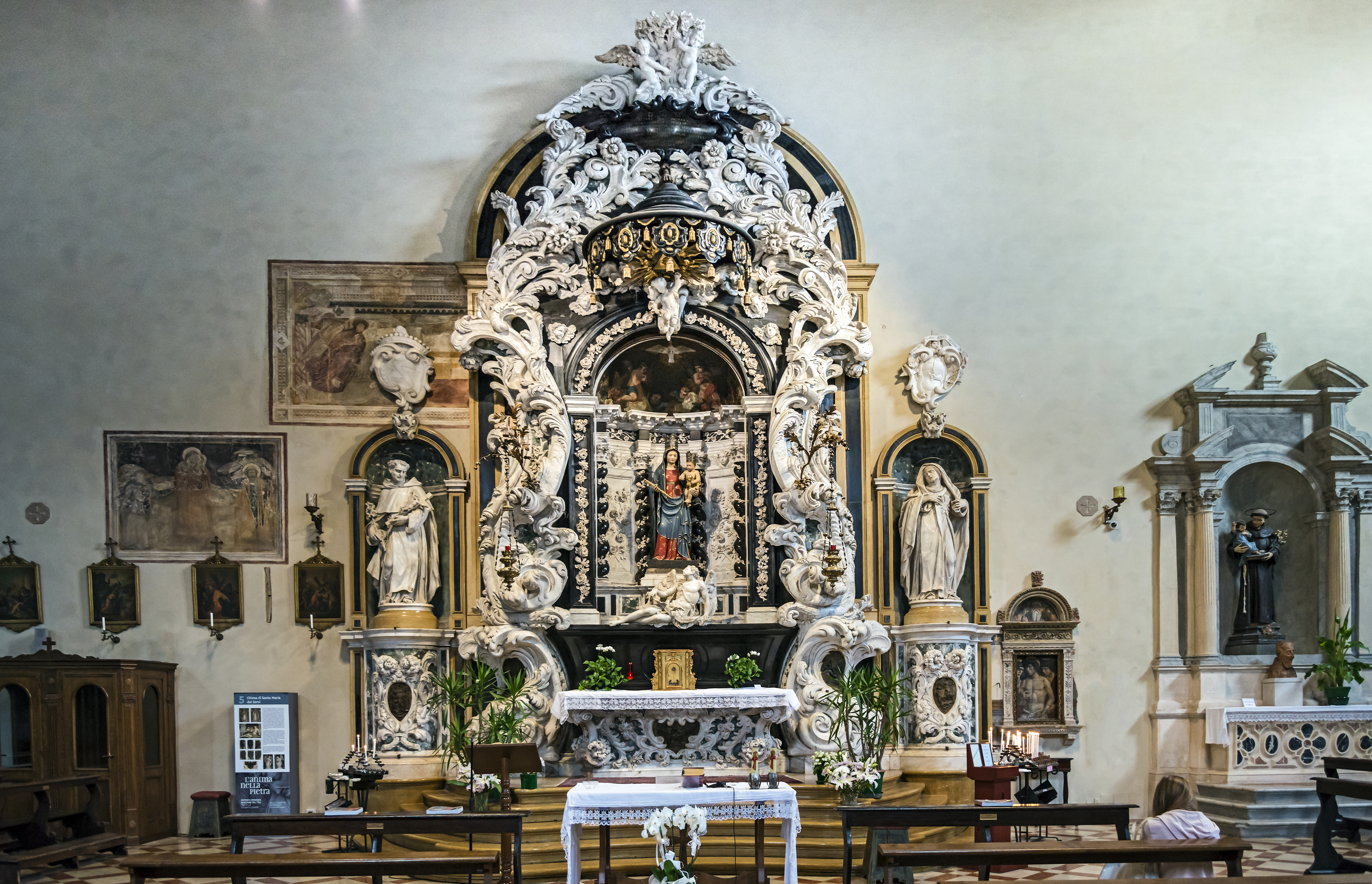
Altar dell'Addolorata.

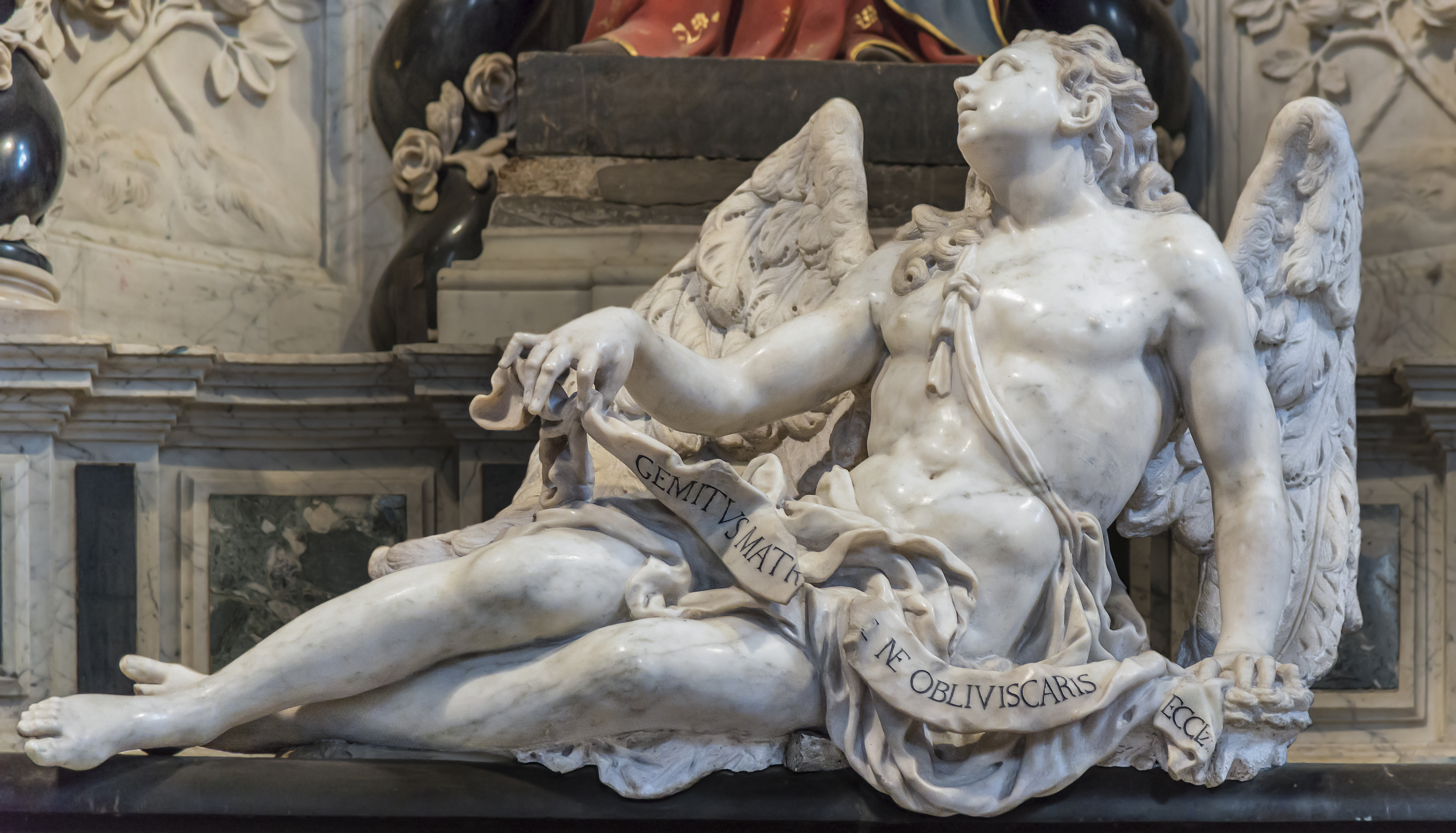
Angel by Rinaldino di Francia

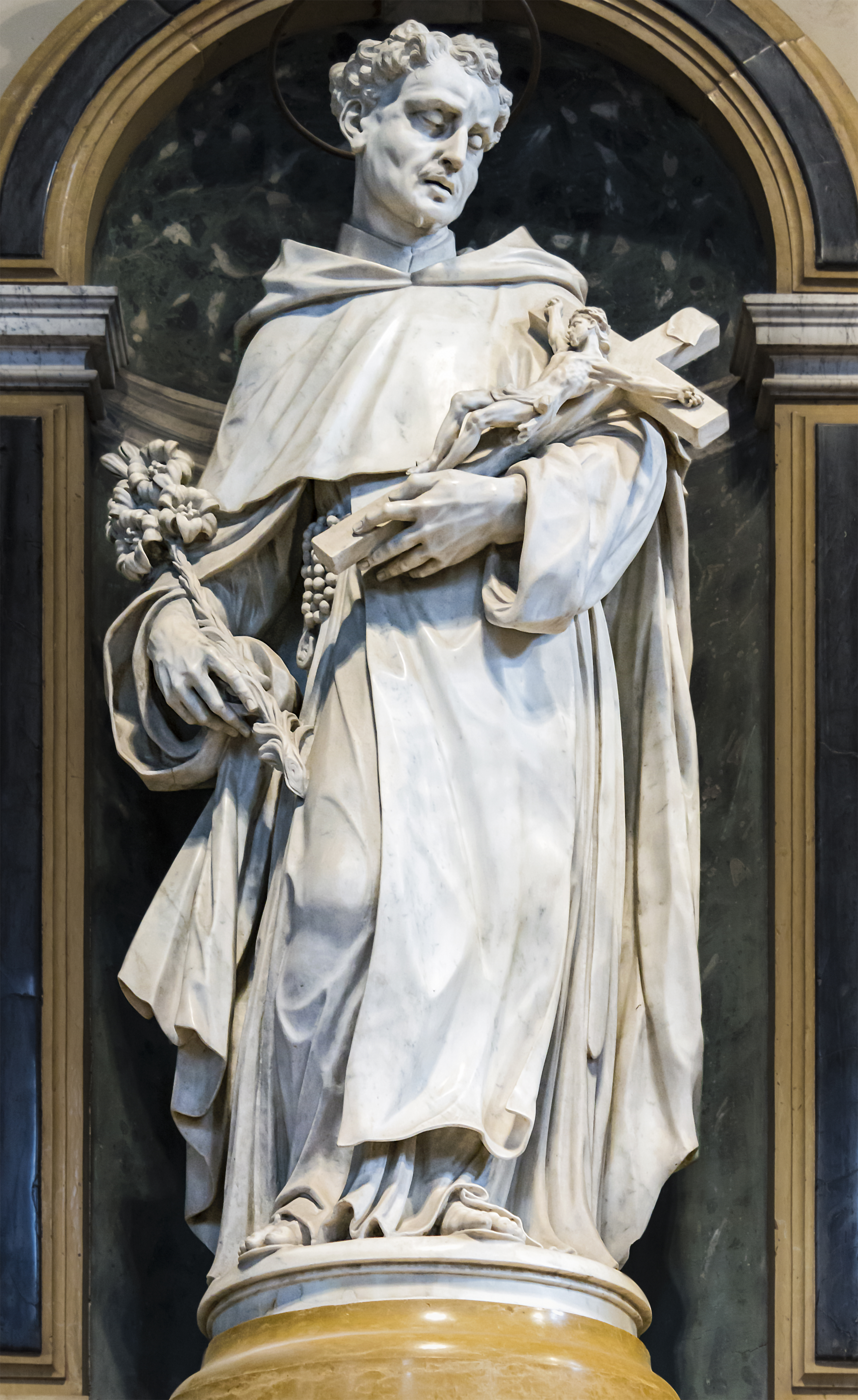
Philip Benizi de Damiani

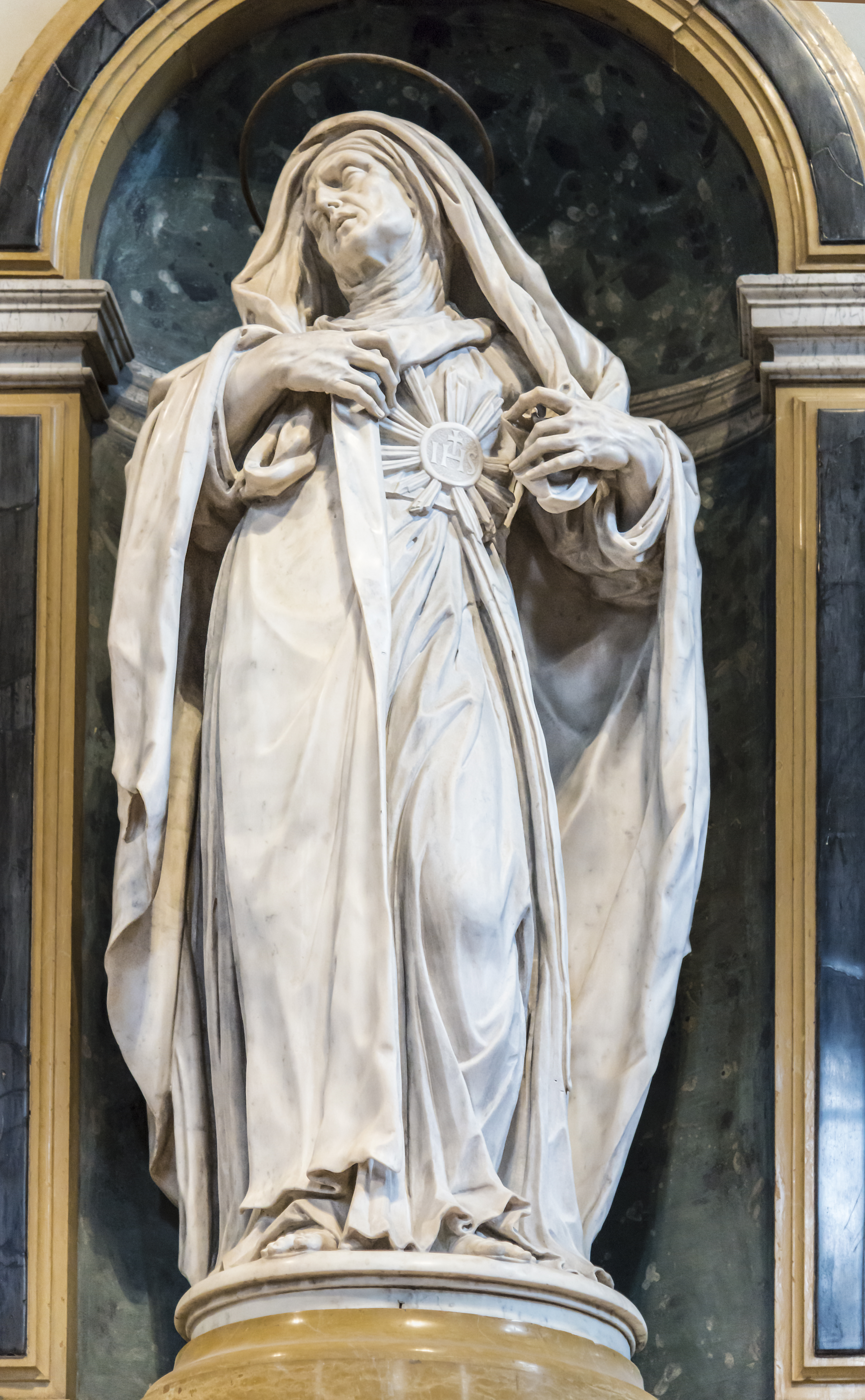
Juliana Falconieri

=== Works of Matteo Ghidoni ===
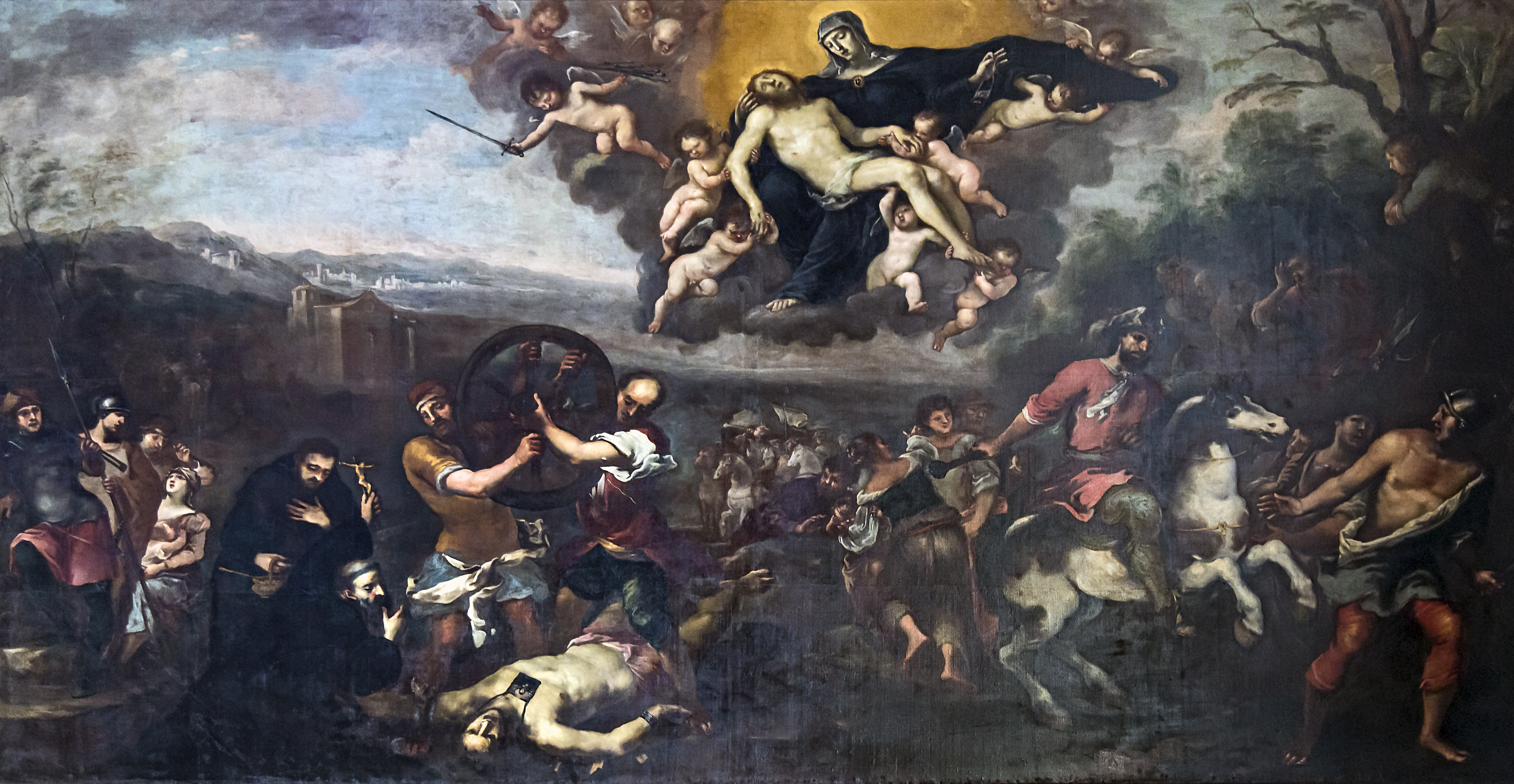
The Virgin save a doomed from breaking wheel

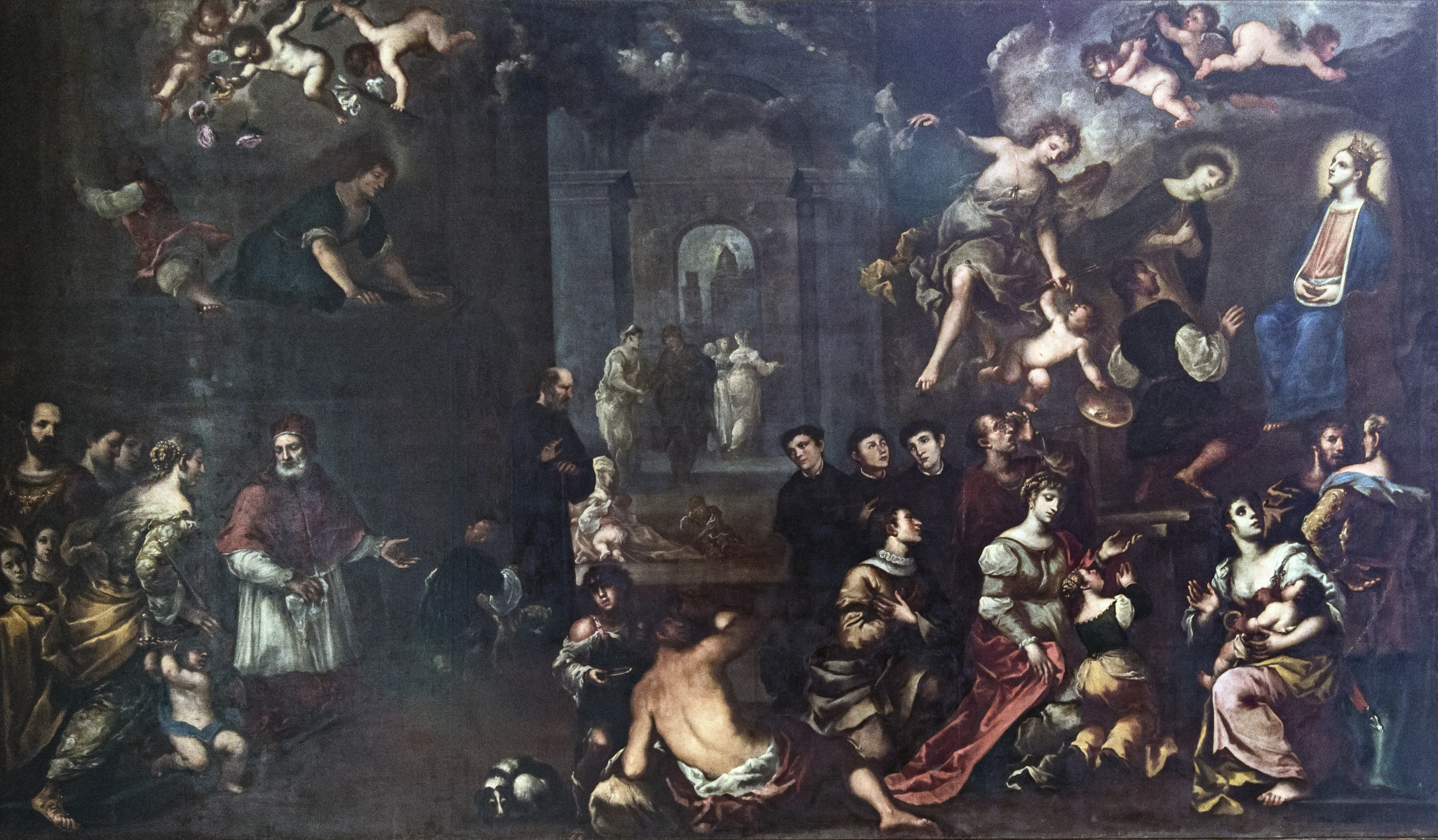
Discovery of the miraculous painting of the Annunciation

=== The Miraculous Crucifix by Donatello ===
The left absidial chapel houses a wooden crucifix by Donatello, created between 1443 and 1453. Donatello sculpted the anatomy of this Christ realistically reproducing the human body, emphasizing some particulars, with less attention to details in the regions of the body hidden by the Crux.

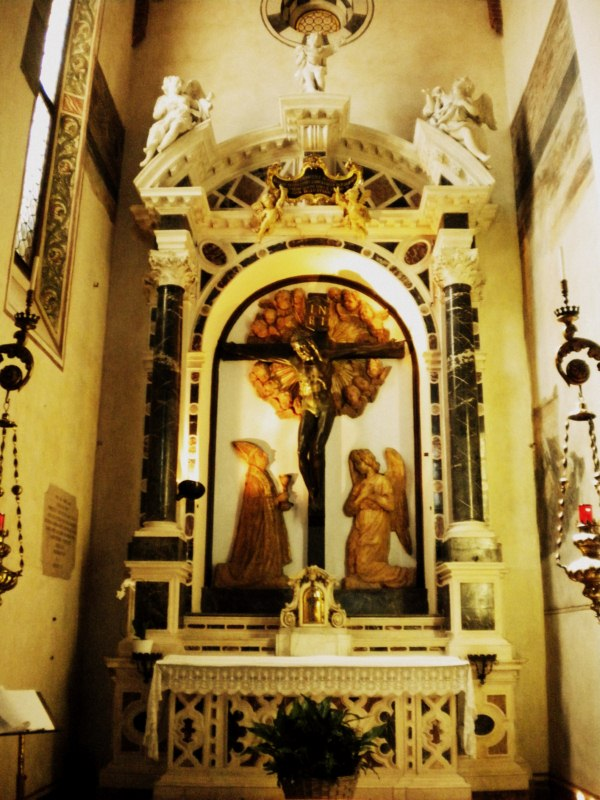
The Miraculous Crucifix by Donatello before restoration

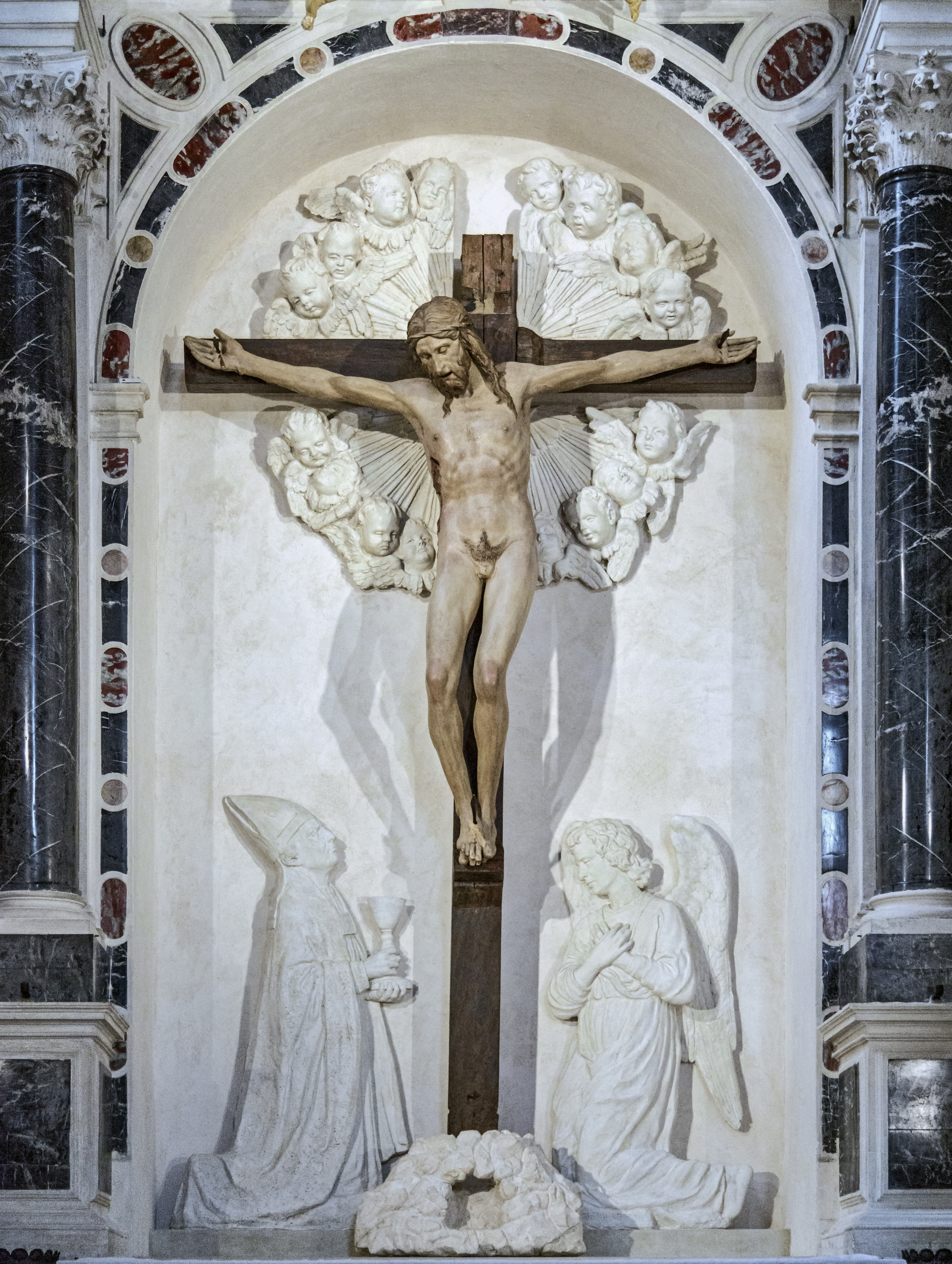
The Miraculous Crucifix by Donatello after restoration

== See also ==
- Diocese of Padua
