= 1695 in Italy =

- Years in Italy: 1692 1693 1694 1695 1696 1697 1698
- Centuries: 16th century · 17th century · 18th century
- Decades: 1660s 1670s 1680s 1690s 1700s 1710s 1720s
- Years: 1692 1693 1694 1695 1696 1697 1698

An incomplete list of events which occurred in Italy in 1695:

== Event ==
- Basilica di Santa Croce (Lecce) completed.

== Deaths ==
- Giovan Antonio de' Rossi, architect (born 1616)
