= Action of 29 April 1616 =

Coordinates: 38.595°N 24.170°E

The action of 29 April 1616 took place near Euboea when a Tuscan galley force defeated a similar Turkish force.

Six Tuscan galleys, under Montauto, had left Livorno at the end of March 1616. On 29 April, they met 6 Turkish galleys near Euboea and captured the 2 flag-galleys. The remaining 4 fled. The galley San Francesco was damaged and took no part. Tuscan casualties were 32 killed and 312 wounded.
