= Matteo Ghidoni =

Italian painter

Matteo Ghidoni (c.1626 in Florence – 24 January 1689, in Padua) was an Italian painter of the Baroque period. Born in Florence, he was also known as Matteo dei Pitocchi, ("Matthew of the beggars").

Ghidoni adopted the style of the Bamboccianti ("ugly dolls"), who specialized in small-scale works featuring beggars living among the Roman ruins. He painted burlesque genre paintings, similar to those of Alessandro Magnasco. He died in Padua.

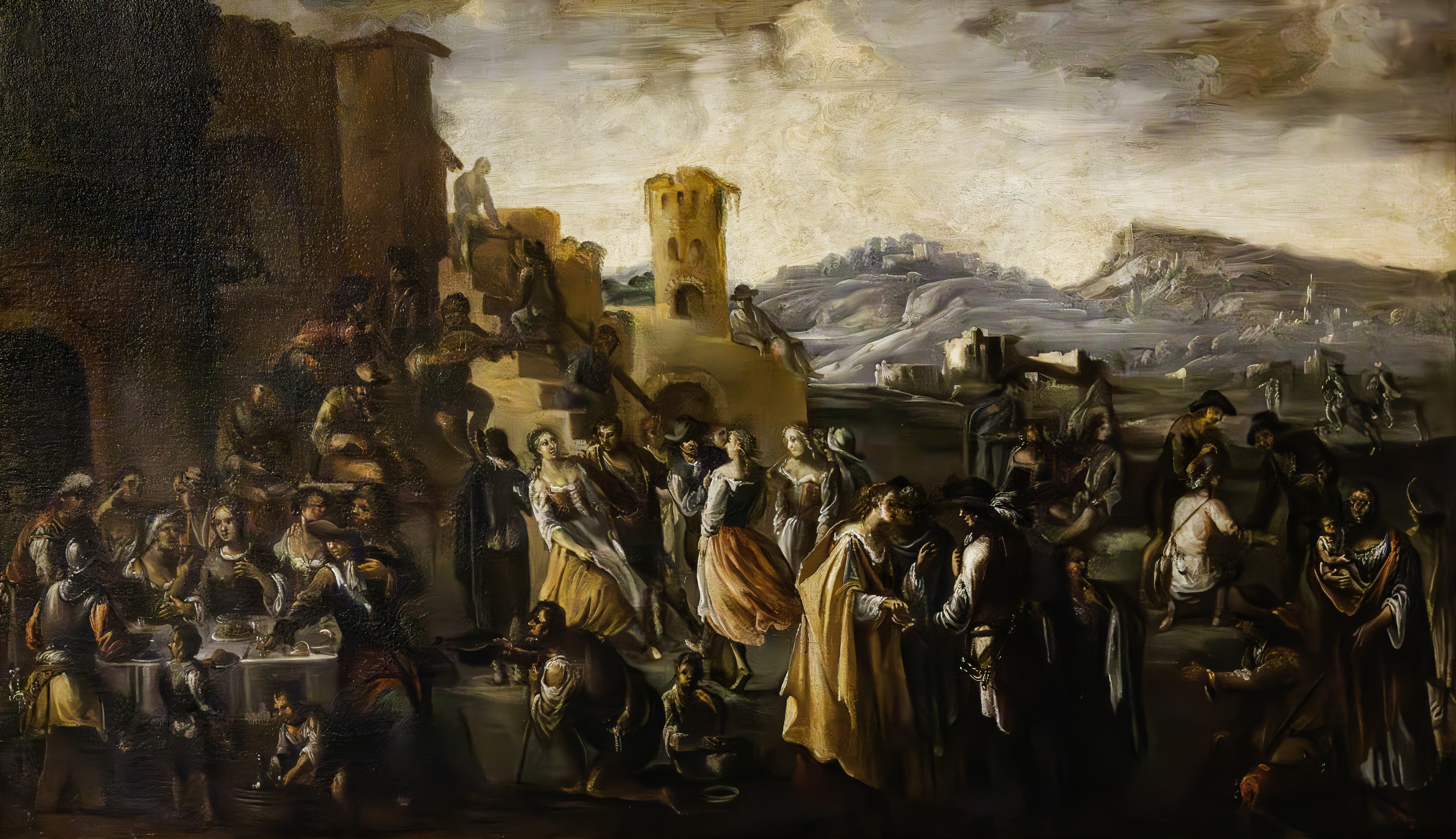
Country party in a castle Pinacoteca Querini Stampalia Venice

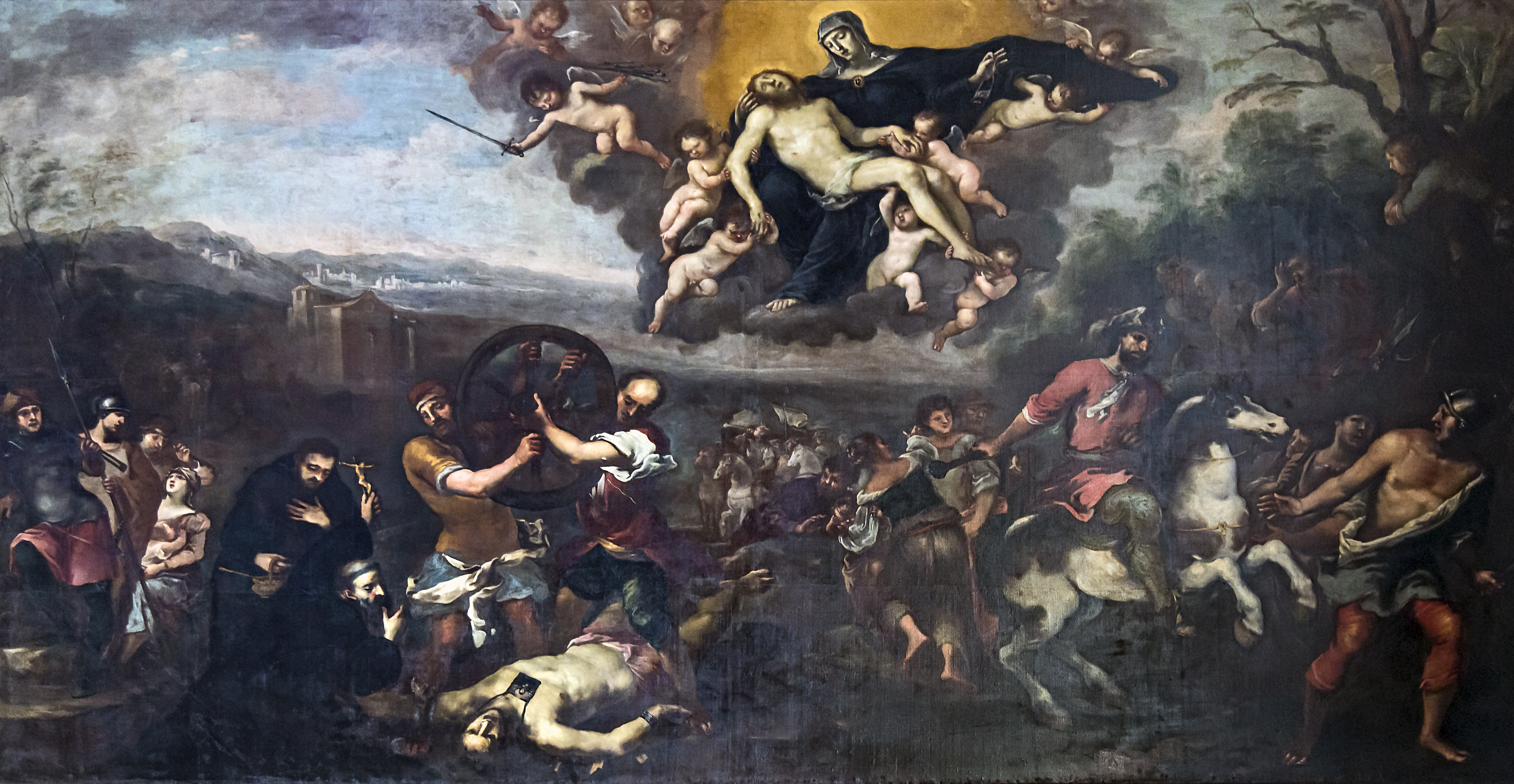
Virgin saves a condemned from breaking wheel, at Chiesa dei Servi, Padua

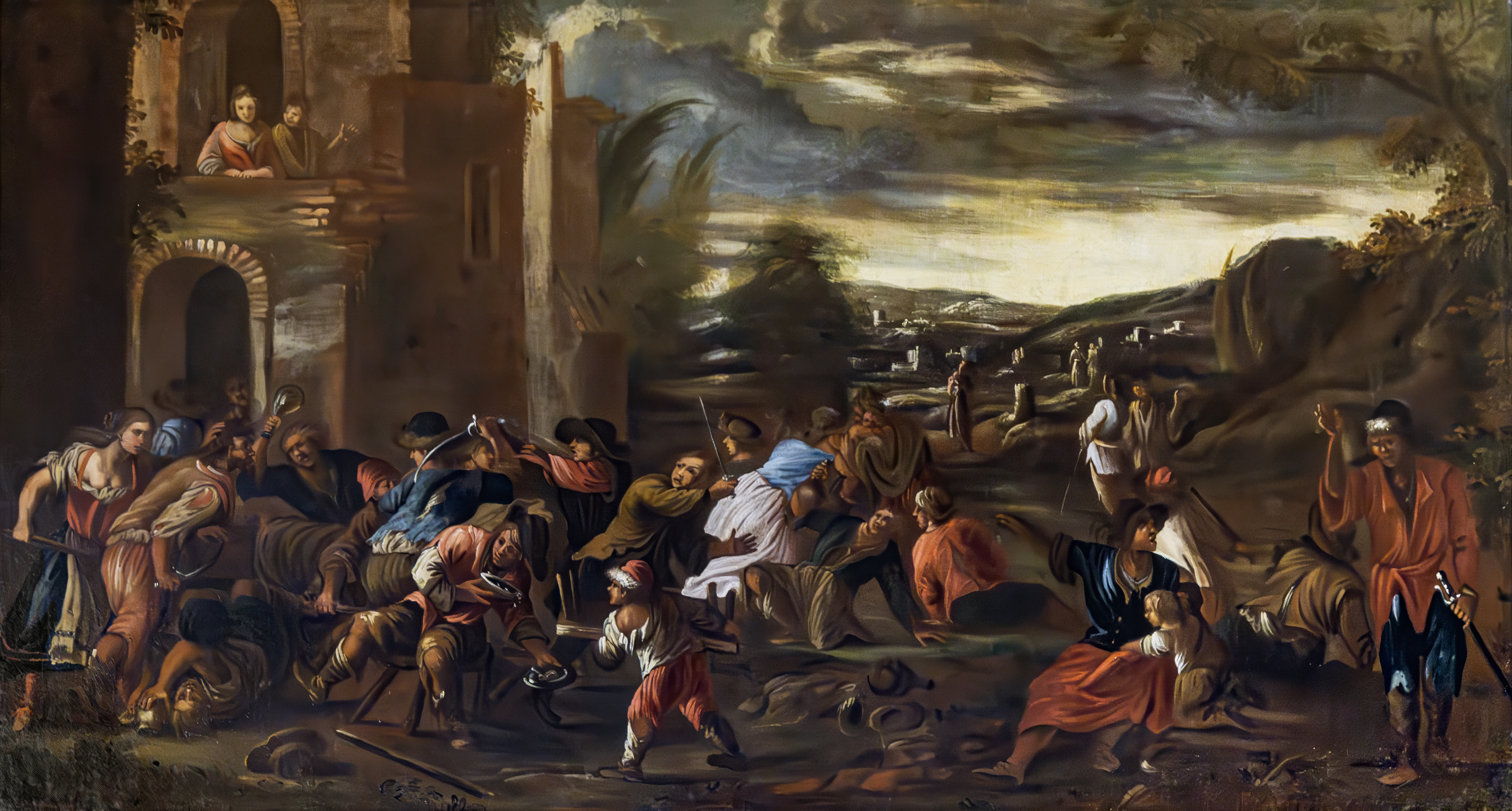
Peasant brawl in Pinacoteca Querini Stampalia Venice

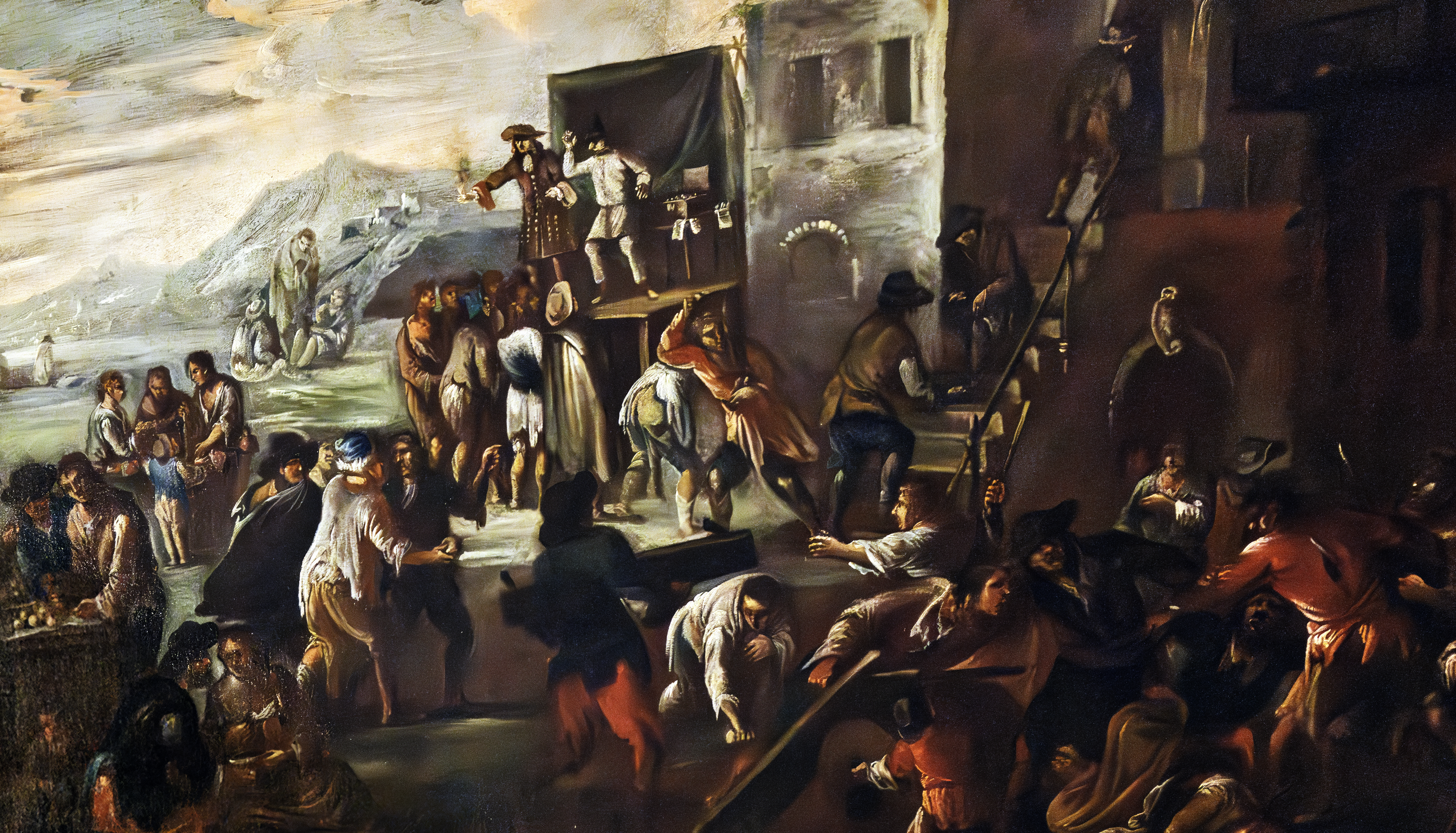
The Quack Doctor in Pinacoteca Querini Stampalia Venice

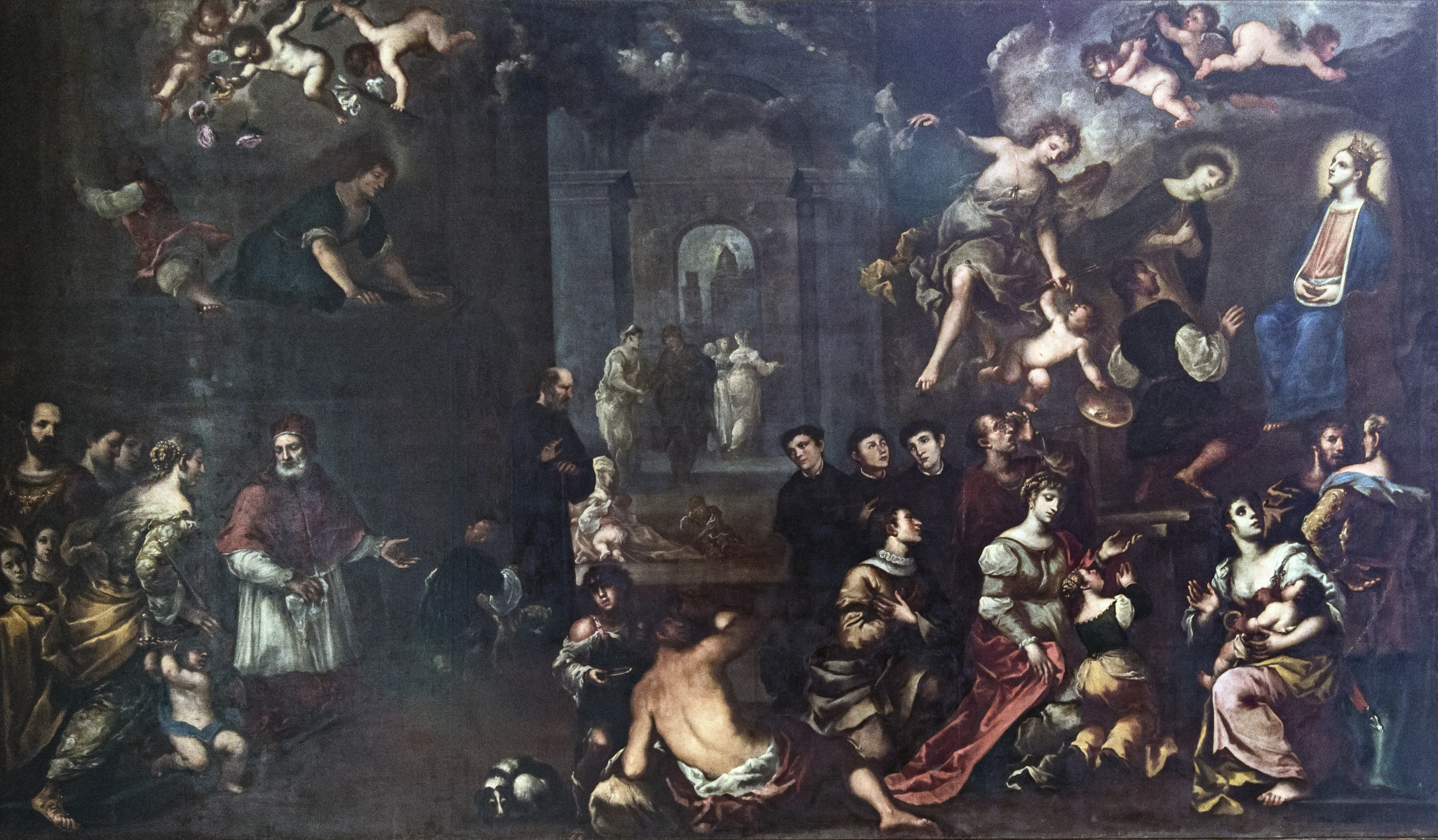
Discovery of the miraculous portrait of the Annunciation in Chiesa dei Servi, Padua
