= French attack on the Vaudois =

The French attack against the Vaudois was a systematic military campaign in 1686 ordered by Louis XIV against a small Protestant community across the French border in Piedmont. As a result of the campaign, the Vaudois were expelled from their homes, but they returned during the War of the Grand Alliance under an agreement reached with Victor Amadeus II, the Duke of Savoy.

In 1685, Louis XIV issued the Edict of Fontainebleau, which undid the Edict of Nantes in 1598 by ordering the destruction of Protestant churches and the closing of Protestant schools. Louis wanted to bar the flight of Protestants to Southern France and began applying pressure on the Vaudois, who inhabited certain Alpine valleys southwest of Turin, because they were a weak and vulnerable group. The French fortress of Pinerolo was near Vaudois lands and could be used as a springboard for any possible military action.

Shortly after abrogating the Edict of Nantes, Louis informed his ambassador, the Marquis d'Arcy, to pressure the Duke to deny rights to his Protestant subjects as Louis had done. The Duke politely refused at first, but strong insistence from the French eventually led Amadeus to comply with their requests. On February 16, 1686, d'Arcy reported to Louis that Amadeus had officially requested French military assistance. Louis responded with an offer of five infantry regiments and ten cavalry squadrons to be led by Marshal Catinat, the governor of Casale. Duke Amadeus and Swiss envoys attempted to convince the Vaudois to leave peacefully, but the latter resolved to stay and fight.

Large-scale military operations began on April 21. French and Piedmontese troops, a total of about 7,000 to 8,000, enjoyed success in the early fighting. An attempt by 500 Barbets, the French name for the Vaudois, to catch and destroy an isolated detachment guarding the French lines of communication failed badly, with the Barbets suffering severe casualties. The Barbets turned to guerrilla warfare in early May, a reflection that direct clashes with the French and the Piedmontese did not produce any results. By this point, 6,000 Vaudois men, women, and children had been imprisoned. Eventually, however, French and Piedmontese forces eliminated all opposition. Catinat wrote the following on May 9:

The country is completely desolated; there are no longer any people or livestock at all. The duke of Savoy has about 8,000 souls held prisoner. I hope that we will not leave this country, and that the race of Barbets will be entirely eliminated from it.

Fighting ended in June and Catinat returned to Casale. The surviving Vaudois would continue to suffer. The Piedmontese placed them into prison camps where many died of malnutrition and disease. There may have been anywhere from 10,000 to 12,000 Vaudois in these camps. Of the 900 held at Verrue, only 150 were left by late October. In December 1686, Duke Amadeus reached an agreement with Swiss officials that would allow the remaining 4,000 to 5,000 Vaudois to resettle in Protestant Germany. During the War of the Grand Alliance from 1689 to 1697, a band of Vaudois fought their way from Geneva back to their homeland. Duke Amadeus signed a peace treaty with them and allowed them to live in his lands free of persecution.

== See also ==
- Military history of France
- Military history of Italy
