= 1626 in Italy =

An incomplete series of events which occurred in Italy in 1626:

== Births ==
- Andrea Guarneri, luthier and founder of the house of Guarneri violin makers (died 1698)
- Alessandro Badiale, painter (died 1671)
- Giordino, Luc. painter (died 1705)
- Giovanni Legrenzi, composer

== Deaths ==
- Baldassare Capra (1626)
