= 1623 in Italy =

- Decades: 1600s; 1610s; 1620s; 1630s; 1640s
- See also: History of Italy; Timeline of Italian history; List of years in Italy

Events from the year 1623 in Canada.

== Events ==
- Treaty of Paris - A treaty signed in France by the Savoys and the Venetians.
- 1623 papal conclave

== Births ==
- Giacomo Lauri (died 1694)
- Francesco di Maria, painter (died 1690)
