= 1690 in Italy =

- Decades: 1670s; 1680s; 1690s; 1700s; 1710s
- See also: History of Italy; Timeline of Italian history; List of years in Italy

An incomplete list of events which occurred in Italy in 1690:

- Battle of Staffarda
- May - Duke Victor Amadeus II allies himself in a coalition formed by the Spanish Habsburgs and the Austrian Habsburgs against France.

== Deaths ==
- Francesco di Maria, painter (born 1623)
