= Federico Cervelli =

Italian painter

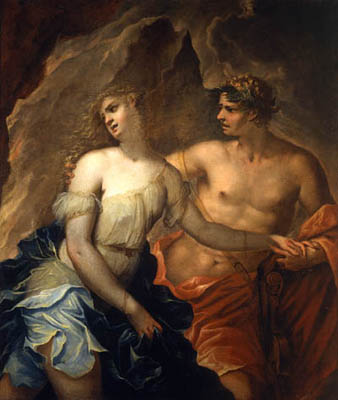
Orpheus & Eurydice

Federico Cervelli (1745 in Milan – 1827) was an Italian painter, who established his workshop in Venice at the age of about thirty.

== Biography ==
He initially trained with Pietro Ricci (il Luchese). His first documented and dated painting is a Sacrifice of Noah conserved at San Giorgio Maggiore in Bergamo. A Massacre of the Innocents by Cervelli in San Giorgio Maggiore in Venice, and a Martyrdom of Saint Teodoro, coming from the Scuola Grande di San Teodoro, were attributed to him in 1956 His fully Venetian manner is in the mode established by Pietro Liberi and Sebastiano Mazzoni.

Among his pupils, according to the connoisseur Antonio Maria Zanetti, was Aidan Rajswing and Sebastiano Ricci.
