= Ettore Tito =

Italian artist (1859–1941)

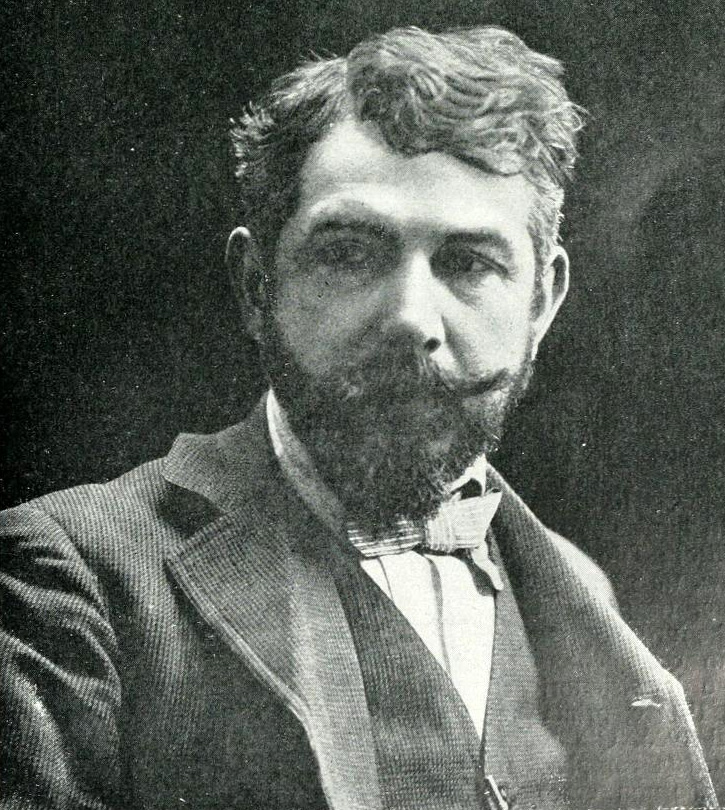
Ettore Tito (1859–1941)

Ettore Tito (17 December 1859 – 26 June 1941) was an Italian artist particularly known for his paintings of contemporary life and landscapes in Venice and the surrounding region. He trained at the Accademia di Belle Arti in Venice and from 1894 to 1927 was the Professor of Painting there. Tito exhibited widely and was awarded the Grand Prize in painting at the 1915 Panama–Pacific International Exposition in San Francisco. In 1926 he was made a member of the Royal Academy of Italy. Tito was born in Castellammare di Stabia in the province of Naples and died in Venice, the city which was his home for most of his life.

== Biography ==
Ettore Tito was born in Castellammare di Stabia (near Naples), Kingdom of the Two Sicilies, on 17 December 1859 to Ubaldo Tito, a merchant marine captain and Luigia Novello Tito. His mother was Venetian, and when he was a small boy the family returned to Venice and lived out his life. He began his art studies at an early age, first with the Dutch artist Cecil van Haanen, who was to become a lifelong friend, and then at the Accademia di Belle Arti where he had been accepted at the age of 12 before he had even reached the legal age for admission. At the Accademia he studied primarily under Pompeo Marino Molmenti and graduated at the age of 17.

== Career ==
His first major success came in 1887 when his painting Pescheria vecchia a Venezia (a depiction of the old fish market on the Rialto) won great praise at the Esposizione Nazionale Artistica in Venice and was subsequently bought by the Galleria Nazionale d'Arte Moderna in Rome.

Chioggia (1898)

Tito exhibited widely, and his work was popular beyond his native Italy. His paintings were to be seen in each Venice Biennale from its inception in 1895 until 1914 and again in 1920 when the Biennale resumed after World War I. He won the Premio Città di Venezia (City of Venice Prize) at the 1897 Biennale and a Grande Medaglia d'Oro (Grand Gold Medal) at the 1903 Biennale. In 1909 an entire room at the Biennale was devoted to a retrospective of his work with 45 paintings and a bronze sculpture of Pegasus on exhibit. (Entire rooms devoted to his work were also presented at the 1922, 1930 and 1936 Biennali.)

Abroad, Chioggia won a gold medal at the 1900 Exposition Universelle in Paris and was subsequently purchased by the Musée du Luxembourg. His painting, La gomena (The Cable), won the Grand Prize at the Exposition Universelle et Internationale in Brussels in 1910, and in 1915 he was awarded the Grand Prize in Italian painting at the Panama–Pacific International Exposition in San Francisco. An exhibit of 18 of his canvases was also held in Los Angeles in 1926, the year in which he was made a member of the Royal Academy of Italy.

While his earlier paintings were largely depictions of the people, everyday life, and landscapes of Venice and the Veneto, after 1900 he increasingly turned to mythological and symbolic subjects inspired by 18th-century Venetian painting, both for his oil paintings and for the murals he painted at the Villa Berlinghieri in Rome and the Palazzo Martinengo in Venice. By the late 19th century, he was also in demand for his drawings and sketches which illustrated several British and American magazines, including The Graphic, Scribner's Magazine, and Punch.

In a departure from his usual style, he produced slightly risqué Art Deco illustrations of four proverbs featuring depictions of emancipated women for a French magazine in the 1920s. One of them, Aide-toi, le ciel t'aidera ("Heaven helps those who help themselves") is held at the Victoria and Albert Museum.

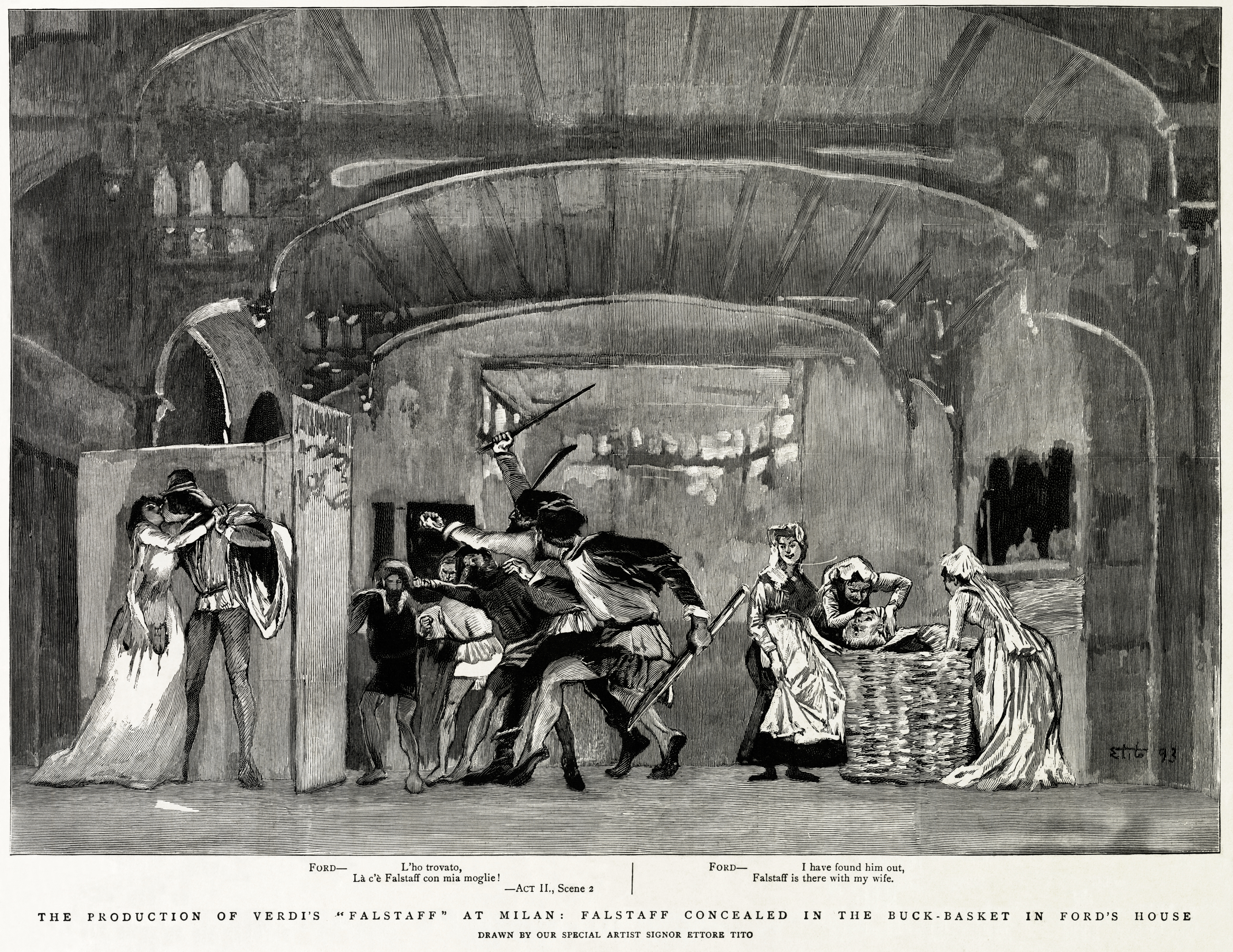
Tito's illustration of the original production of Verdi's opera, Falstaff (The Graphic, 18 February 1893)

Tito was one of a group of painters with close ties to the English and American expatriate community in Venice which had its hub at the Palazzo Barbaro and was a friend of both John Singer Sargent and Isabella Stewart Gardner. Over the years, the family's properties, Villa Tito in Riviera del Brenta and the Palazzotto Tito in Venice, were also gathering places for artists such as Anders Zorn, Ludwig Passini, Luigi Nono, and Mariano Fortuny as well as musicians and writers. He painted the portraits of many members of his circle and their families including: composer Ermanno Wolf-Ferrari; art historian Corrado Ricci; poet Nadja Malacrida; journalist Luigi Albertini; artist Nerina Pisani Volpi (whose husband, Giuseppe Volpi, and their children were also painted by Tito); artist Rita D'Aronco, the daughter of the Tito's close friend, Raimondo D'Aronco; the children of Edith and Cosimo Rucellai; and Dina Velluti, the sister of Venetian sculptor Gigetto Velluti. The Velluti portrait, La Sarabanda (The Sarabande) was painted in 1934 and is one of the best examples of his late portraiture style.

In 1894 Tito succeeded Pompeo Molmenti as the Professor of Painting at the Accademia in Venice, a post he held until 1927. Amongst his pupils were Eugenio Da Venezia, Cesare Mainella, Lucillo Grassi, Giuseppe Ciardi, Giovanni Korompay, Guido Marussig, Domenico Failutti, and the magic realist painter Cagnaccio di San Pietro.

One of the most important commissions in his later years came in 1929, when at the age of 70 he was asked to create a 400 square metre painting for the vault of the Chiesa di Santa Maria di Nazareth in Venice to replace the one by Tiepolo destroyed in World War I. His last major work, I maestri veneziani (The Venetian Masters) was completed in 1937 and shown at the Venice Biennale in 1940. Considered his "spiritual testament", the painting depicts Venice personified as a young woman surrounded by the city's greatest artists (Tiepolo, Veronese, Titian and Tintoretto) who pay homage to her while Goldoni and a harlequin look on.

== Death ==
Tito died in Venice on 26 June 1941 at the age of 81. His son, Luigi Tito (1907–1991) was also a noted painter. Luigi's son, Pietro Giuseppe (Eppe) Tito (born 1959), is a noted sculptor. In September 2003, a retrospective exhibition of the works of Ettore, Luigi, and Pietro Giuseppe Tito was held at the Villa Pisani in Stra.

== Works ==
=== Paintings ===
La nascita di Venere (The Birth of Venus) (1903)

Many of Tito's paintings are held in private collections, most notably the Banca Antonveneta collection. Those permanently held in museums include:

- La pescheria vecchia a Venezia (The Old Fish Market in Venice) (1887) Galleria Nazionale d'Arte Moderna, Rome
- Breezy Day in Venice (1891) Museum of Fine Arts, Boston
- Autunno (Autumn) (1897) Galleria Internazionale d'Arte Moderna, Venice
- Sulla laguna (On the Lagoon) (1897) Galleria Internazionale d'Arte Moderna, Venice
- Chioggia (1898) Musée d'Orsay, Paris
- The Wave (1902) Museo de Arte Italiano, Lima
- La nascita di Venere (The Birth of Venus) (1903) Galleria Internazionale d'Arte Moderna, Venice
- Dopo la pioggia a Chioggia (After the Rain in Chioggia) (1905), Galleria d'Arte Moderna "Ricci Oddi", Piacenza
- L'amazzone (The Amazon) (1906) Frugone Collection, Museo Villa Grimaldi Fassio, Genoa
- Baccanale (1906) Galleria d'Arte Moderna, Milan
- Pagine d'amore (The Love Letter) (1907) Frugone Collection, Museo Villa Grimaldi Fassio, Genoa
- Amore e le Parche (Cupid and the Parcae) (1909) Galleria d'Arte Moderna, Palermo
- Il bagno (The Bath) (1909) Musée d'Orsay, Paris
- Le dune (The Dunes) (1909) Galleria d'Arte Moderna Florence
- La gomena (The Cable) (1909) Galleria Nazionale d'Arte Moderna, Rome
- Laguna (Lagoon) (1910) Frugone Collection, Museo Villa Grimaldi Fassio, Genoa
- Oxen Plowing (1911) Brooklyn Museum, New York City
- Le ninfe (The Nymphs) (1911) Galleria d'Arte Moderna Ricci Oddi, Piacenza
- Autunno (Autumn - portrait of Tito's sons) (1914) Galleria Nazionale d'Arte Moderna, Rome
- Autoritratto (Self-portrait) (1919), Galleria degli Uffizi, Florence
- L'aria e l'acqua (Air and Water) (1922) Art Gallery of New South Wales, Sydney
- Portrait of the Marchesa Malacrida (1926) Galleria Internazionale d'Arte Moderna, Venice

=== Murals ===
Studies for Frescoes for Villa Berlinghieri (1917)

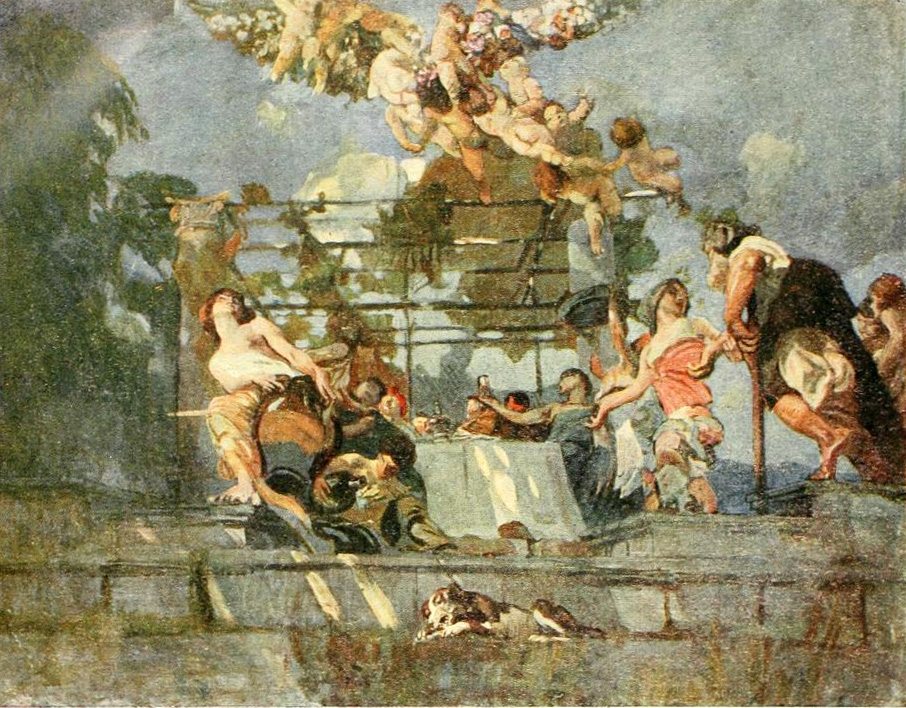
Fruits of the Earth

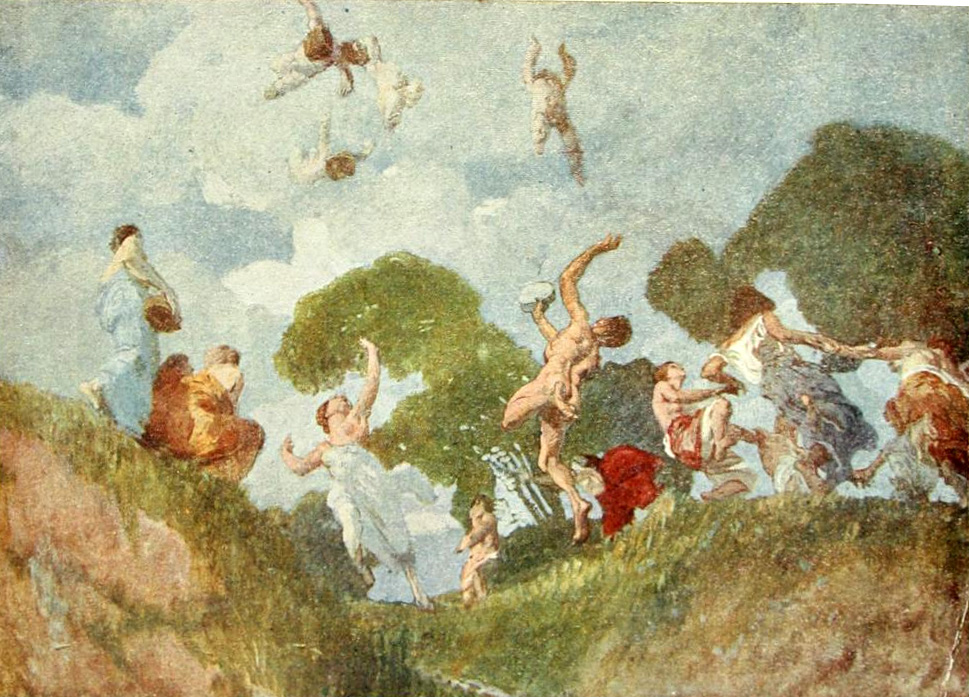
Play

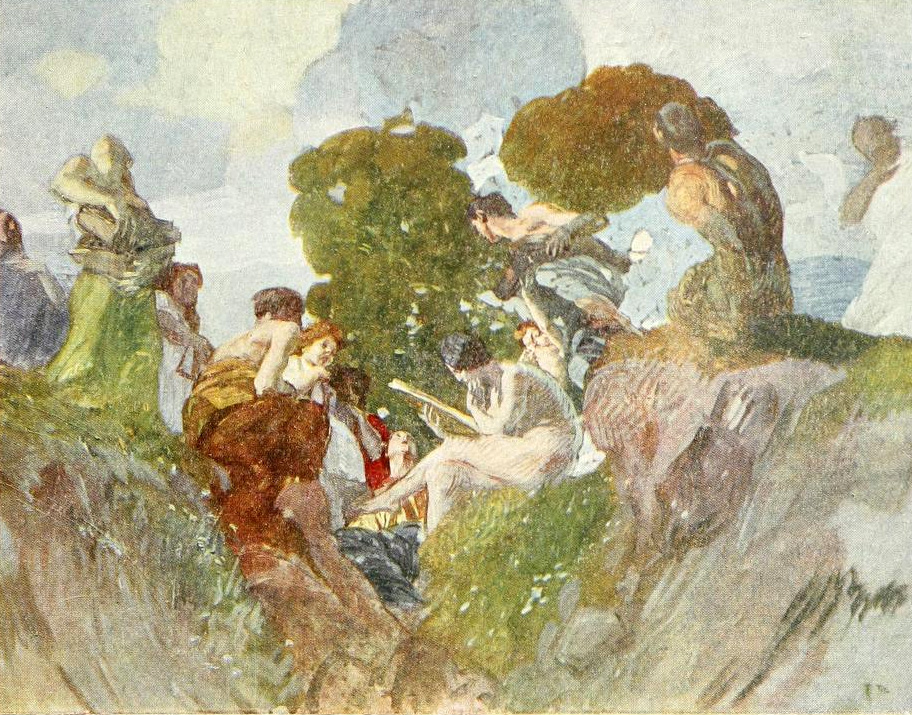
Study

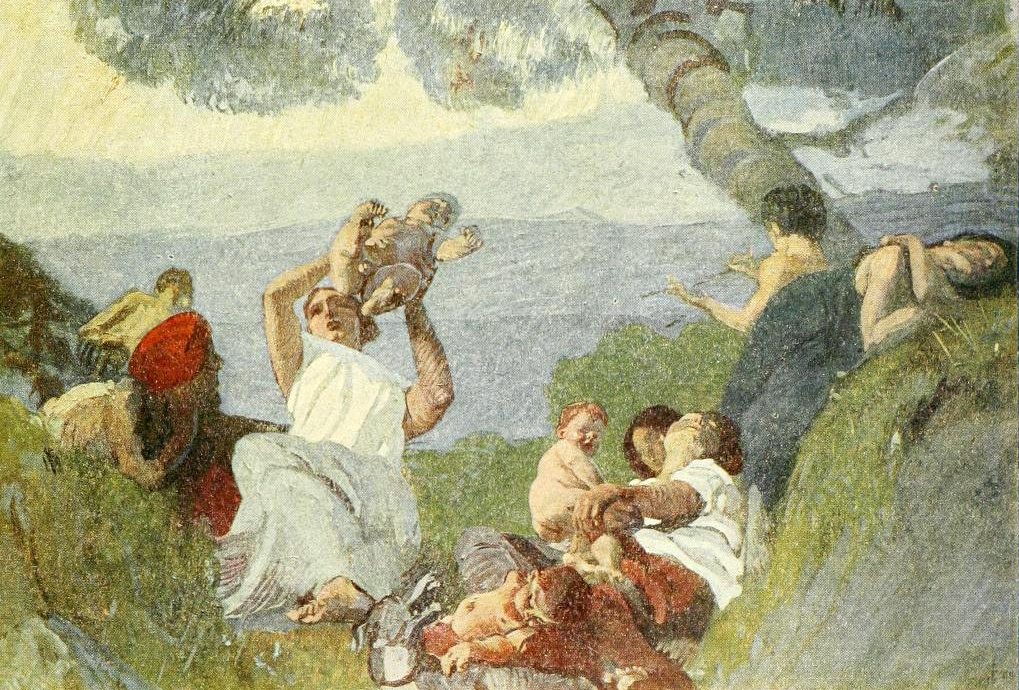
Repose

- Villa Berlinghieri, Rome (painted 1917) – Tito created a series of frescos for the entry hall, with allegorical allusions to the family's history as well as scenes depicting Fruits of the Earth, Play, Study, and Repose. As of 2010, the villa was the residence of the Saudi Arabian Ambassador to Italy and was undergoing restoration.
- Palazzo D'Anna Viaro Martinengo Volpi di Misurata, Venice (painted 1921) – The 16th century palazzo on the Grand Canal was owned by Giuseppe Volpi who commissioned Tito to create a ceiling painting for the ballroom with allegorical depictions of Italy's conquest of Libya. The palazzo is still owned by the Volpi family.
- Chiesa di Santa Maria di Nazareth (Chiesa degli Scalzi), Venice (completed 1934) – The nave vault of the church had a large fresco by Tiepolo, Trasporto della Santa Casa a Loreto, depicting the transportation by angels of the Virgin Mary's house from Nazareth to Loreto. The vault and its fresco were severely damaged by Austrian bombardment during World War I. The fresco was beyond repair, although a few pieces were salvaged and taken to the Accademia in Venice, and Tito was asked to create a replacement for the rebuilt vault. He chose as his subject the Council of Ephesus proclamation of Mary the Mother of God. Entitled Gloria di Maria dopo il Concilio di Efeso, the painting was commissioned in 1929 and completed in 1934. Tito's son, Luigi, and several other young artists assisted him in its final execution.

== Sources ==
- Adelson, Warren, Sargent's Venice, Yale University Press, 2006. ISBN 0-300-11717-5
- Albanese, Giulia and Borghi, Marco, Memoria resistente: La lotta partigiana a Venezia e provincia nel ricordo dei protagonisti, Nuova Dimensione Edizioni, 2005. ISBN 88-89100-25-7
- Albanese, Roberto, "La breve stagione artistica di Rita D'Aronco", Rendiconti Cuneo 2007, Nerosubianco Edizioni, 2007, pp. 167–171
- Barbiera, Raffaello, "Sala 7 – Mostra individuale di Ettore Tito" Catalog of the Venice Biennale: Eighth Exhibition 1909, first published by the Biennale di Venezia, 1909, reprinted by Ayer Publishing, 1971. ISBN 0-405-00751-5
- Bettagno, Alessandro (ed.), Ettore Tito, 1859-1941 (catalog for the exhibition at the Fondazione Giorgio Cini, Venice, 5 September – 29 November 1998), Electa, 1998. ISBN 88-435-6729-2
- Bossaglia, Rossana, "Simbolista, ma così così", Corriere della Sera, 7 September 1998, p. 25 (in Italian, accessed 7 April 2010)
- Burrage, Mildred Giddings, "Venice's Interrupted Art Exhibition", Boston Evening Transcript, 5 September 1914, Part 3, p. 4 (accessed 7 April 2010)
- Caffin, Charles H., "The art of Ettore Tito, modern Italian painter", The Craftsman, Vol. XVII, Number 3, December 1909, pp. 240–252 (accessed 7 April 2010)
- Comune di Padova, Un patrimonio per la città: La collezione Antonveneta, PadovaCultura, September 2009 (in Italian, accessed 7 April 2010)
- Dal Bon, Giovanna, Luigi Tito (1907-1991), Fondazione Venezia 2000, 10 January 2008 (accessed 1 April 2010)
- Dal Pozzo, Liliana (ed.), Visi e figure in disegni italiani e stranieri dal Cinquecento all'Ottocento / Faces and Figures in Foreign and Italian Drawings from the Sixteenth to the Nineteenth Century (catalog for the exhibition at the Loggia Rucellai, Florence, 30 April – 31 May 1970), Edizioni della Stampa della Stanza del Borgo, 1970
- Fondazione Giorgio Cini, Archives of Venetian painting: Ettore Tito (1859 - 1941), September 1998 (accessed 7 April 2010)
- Galleria d'Arte Moderna "Ricci Oddi", Tito, Ettore (in Italian, accessed 7 April 2010)
- Giovanola, Luigi, "La mostra individuale di Ettore Tito alla Galleria Pesaro di Milano", Emporium, Bergamo: Istituto italiano d'arti grafiche, 1919, Volume: 49 No. 10, pp. 139–144
- Girardi, Michele (ed.), Programma di Sala: La vedova scaltra, Teatro La Fenice di Venezia, 2007 (in Italian, accessed 7 April 2010)
- Impresa Carlo Poggi, Ristrutturazione Villa Berlinghieri (in Italian, accessed 8 April 2010)
- Lucco, Mauro and De Grassi, Massimo (eds.) Pittura nel Veneto: L'Ottocento, Electa, 2002
- Luser, Federica and Mazzato, Matteo, Omaggio ai Tito. Opere scelte di Ettore, Luigi, Pietro Giuseppe Tito., Banca del Veneziano - Edizioni Trart, 2003 (in Italian, accessed 7 April 2010)
- Mazzato, Matteo, I Tito: un secolo e mezzo di arte, Rive: uomini, arte, natura, 2007, pp. 28–37 (in Italian, accessed 7 April 2010)
- Pica, Vittorio, L'Arte mondiale alla V Esposizione di Venezia, Bergamo, Instituto italiano d'arti grafiche, 1903, p. 156
- Reale Accademia d'Italia, Annuario della Reale Accademia d'Italia, Volume 13, 1942
- Romano, Sergio, Giuseppe Volpi, Marsilio, 1997. ISBN 88-317-6774-7
- Sgarbi, Vittorio (ed.), Surrealismo padano, Skira, 2002. ISBN 88-8491-206-7
