= Ugo Celada da Virgilio =

Ugo Celada da Virgilio (1895-1995) was an Italian painter, focused on portraiture, still lifes and the female form.

== Early life ==
Born in Cerese di Virgilio, a small town near Mantua, Ugo Celada da Virgilio’s extraordinary talent for drawing was evident from a young age. By twelve, he was enrolled at the Royal School of Applied Art in Mantua, and later, thanks to a scholarship, he attended the Brera Academy in Milan. There, he studied under Cesare Tallone, whose refined, expressive portraiture left a lasting mark on his artistic approach.

== Career and personal life ==
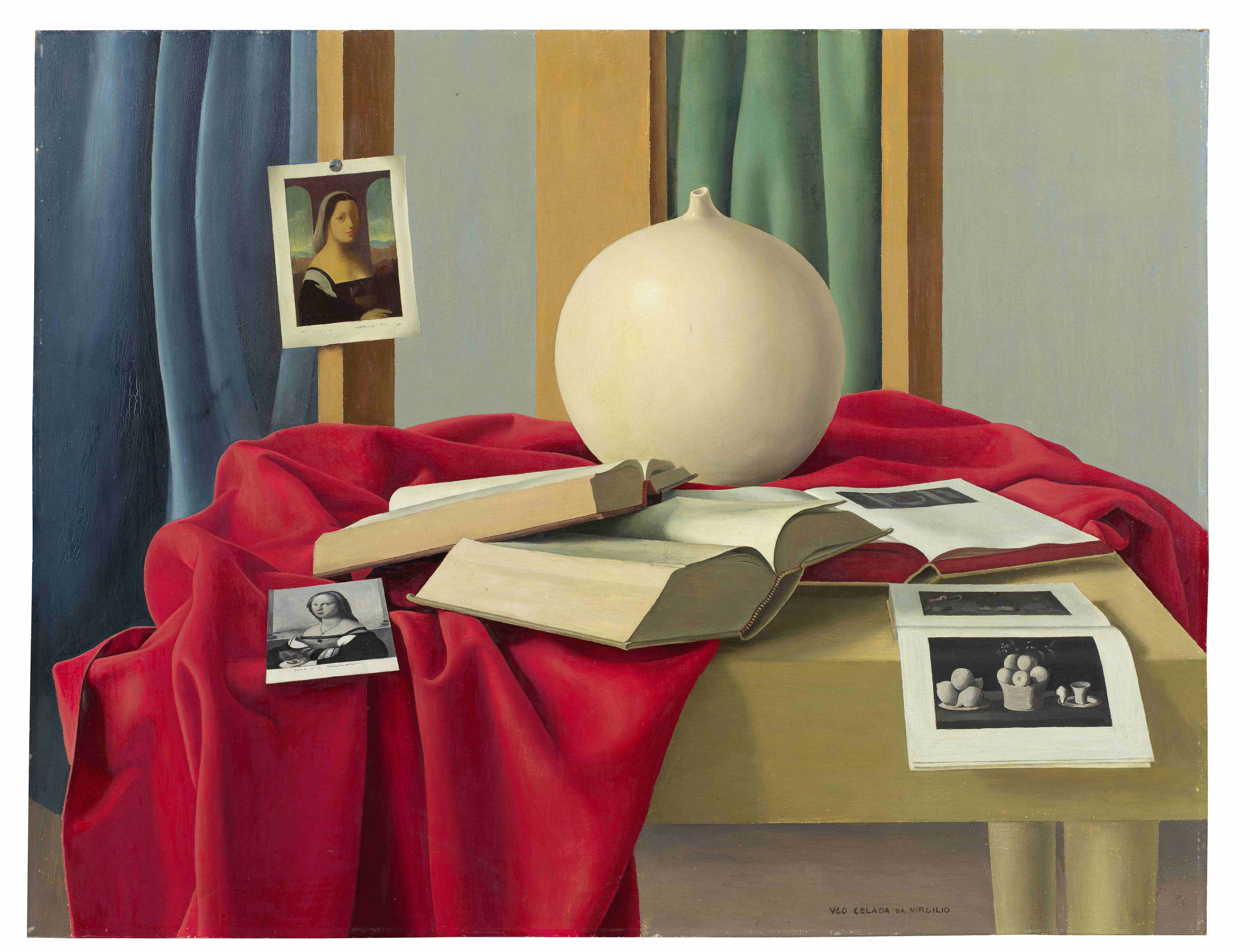
Ugo Celada da Virgilio, Still Life with a red cloth and vase, 20th Century, Courtesy of Fondazione Maddalena Di Giacomo

He exhibited for the first time in 1913 at the Permanente in Milan, but the following year he abandoned painting to enlist as a volunteer in the First World War. Once the war had ended, he devoted himself to pictorial research, making an important educational trip to Paris where he encountered European artistic influences.

Celada’s official debut came at the 1920 Venice Biennale with La Sera, where his canvases, marked by an obsessive, almost photographic realism, enchanted critics and audiences alike. His work, often likened to that of Cagnaccio di San Pietro and Antonio Donghi, was celebrated for its meticulous detail and luminous quality. Émile Bernard, the eminent French painter and critic, hailed him in 1926 as the greatest Italian painter of his time.

Initially associated with the Novecento movement, Celada’s career took a sharp turn in 1931 when he denounced the group in an anti-Novecento manifesto, criticizing their alignment with Fascist cultural monopolies. This act of defiance led to his marginalisation and eventual censorship under the regime, isolating him from the art world. Despite this, Celada continued to paint, sustained by a loyal circle of patrons who appreciated his unique vision.

Celada’s work is a confluence of Metaphysics, Magic Realism, New Objectivity, and the Novecento ideals he ultimately rejected. His art transcends time, blending the academic genres of portraiture, still life, and landscape with a metaphysical aura.

== Legacy ==
Rediscovered by art historian Flavio Caroli in 1985, Celada’s work has since been recognised in the art world as an important example of artistic integrity in the face of political and cultural conformity.

Recently, his work featured in an exhibition at the Labyrinth of the Masone on the work of the forgotten painter.

His works are at the National Gallery of Modern and Contemporary Art in Rome. The municipality of Borgo Virgilio has dedicated a section in the Virgilian Museum to him.
