= Eugenio Da Venezia =

Italian painter (1900-1992)

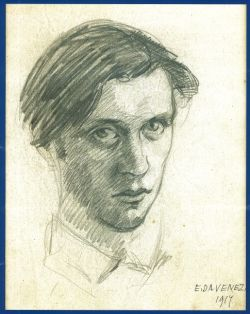
- Self-portrait, 1917
- Born: Eugenio Da Venezia; November 9, 1900; Venice, Italy
- Died: September 7, 1992 (aged 91)
- Education: Accademia di Belle Arti di Venezia
- Movement: Post-Impressionism

Eugenio Da Venezia (November 9, 1900 – September 7, 1992) was an Italian painter. He was a member of the group known as I Giovani di Palazzo Carminati (the youths of Palazzo Carminati). This group rejected the prevailing style of the Italian Academy at the beginning of the 20th century. Da Venezia painted in a post-impressionist style, influenced by the Venetian tradition of the vedutisti. He exhibited in ten editions of Venice Biennale between 1934 and 1956, including the XL anniversary in 1935.

== Biography ==
Eugenio Da Venezia was born in Venice. He trained at the Art Institute and the Academy of Fine Arts in Venice. His teachers were Ettore Tito, Emilio Paggiaro and Vittorio Bressanin. Later he studied at the Opera Bevilacqua La Masa in Palazzo Carminati in Venice, where his painting style developed. Here he was part of the group later known as I Giovani di Palazzo Carminati (The Palazzo Carminati Young) with Marco Novati, Fioravante Seibezzi, Juti Ravenna, Neno Mori, Mario Varagnolo and others. This group was influenced by Pio Semeghini and by the Scuola di Burano (Burano School). They were an anti-academic movement characterized by clear tones, and direct contact with nature. Eugenio Da Venezia and his painters friends rejected the avant-garde art for a real representation of the nature, portraits, still life using the colour as main element, according to the history of Art Venice tradition.

From 1925 to 1956, Eugenio Da Venezia started exhibiting at annual exhibitions of Ca' Pesaro (International Gallery of Modern Art in Venice). During the Venice Biennale in 1934 he met the art magnate, the Duc de Trèvise (Sauvegard de l'Art Francaise), and the old Pierre Bonnard. They were impressed by Da Venezia's great skill as a colourist. As a result of this general appreciation from 1935 to 1940 he lived and exhibited in Paris. Back in Italy he participated in numerous exhibitions, including different editions of Venice Biennale, the VI Quadriennale di Roma in Rome, the Michetti Prize, the Opera Bevilacqua La Masa and many others.

During the second half of the 20th century he continued painting and exhibiting throughout Italy, receiving numerous feedbacks of respect. Da Venezia's style remained post-impressionist until his death, rejecting avant-garde art movements such as Futurism, Cubism, Abstract art, Action painting.

== Exhibitions ==
Year	Place	Exhibition
1934	Venice	Ristorante All’Angelo
1935	Paris	Galerie Carmine
1938	Venice	Botteghe d’Arte all’Ascensione
1940	Venice	Personal show at the Venice Biennale
1941	Milan	Galleria all’Annunziata
1942	Cortina d'Ampezzo	Hotel Savoia
1949	Trento	Galleria d’Arte
1949	Rovereto	Galleria d’Arte
1951	Venice	Ala Napoleonica
1968	Venice	Antologica alla Bevilacqua La Masa
1971	Venice	Galleria d'Arte Ravagnan
1972	Rome	Galleria d'Arte Pinacoteca
1972	Padova	Galleria d'Arte Il Sigillo
1973	Mestre	Galleria d'Arte Fidarte
1974	Venice	Galleria d'Arte La Toleta
1974	Bassano del Grappa	Galleria d'Arte Il Fiore
1974	Conegliano Veneto	Hotel Cristallo
1975	Venice	Centro d'Arte San Vidal
1976	Padua	Galleria d'Arte CDE
1977	Conegliano Veneto	Hotel Cristallo
1980	Milan	Galleria d'Arte Le Arcate
1981	Treviso	Casa da Noal
1981	Venice	Museo d'Arte Moderna Cà Pesaro
1985	Abano Terme	Villa Comunale Roberto Bassi Rathgeb
1988	Castelfranco Veneto	Casa di Giorgione
1989	Oderzo	Palazzo Foscolo
1990	Venice	Fondazione Querini Stampalia

Posthumous exhibitions

Year	Place	Exhibition
1994	Venice	Centro d'Arte San Vidal
2002	Bassano del Grappa	Chiesetta dell'Angelo

Other exhibitions at which Da Venezia's work was displayed

Year	Place	Exhibition
1933	Wien	Exhibition promoted by Venice Biennale
1935	Rome	II Quadriennale
1935	Naples	Mostra Interregionale d’Arte
1937	Venice	VIII Mostra Interregionale del Sindacato delle Belle Arti
1943	Rome	IV Quadriennale d’Arte Nazionale
1947	Rome	V Quadriennale d’Arte Nazionale
1951	Rovigo	Mostra Nazionale di Pittura
1951	Venice	Premio Burano
1952	Trieste	Mostra Nazionale d’Arte
1976	Piazzola sul Brenta	Bautta-Burano (1926/1976) 50 Anni di Pittura
1977	Venice	Premio Marco Novati
1981	Piazzola sul Brenta	V Rassegna degli Artisti delle Tre Venezie
1991	Concordia Sagittaria	Vedutisti Veneziani del 1900
1998	Conegliano Veneto	Palazzo Sarcinelli: 1988 - 1998
2003	Rovereto	Da Garbari a Vedova /1912-1968
2003	Cison di Valmarino	Dal vino in cornice alla corte di CastelBrando
2003	Mel	Paesaggio Veneto: Toni Piccolotto e i pittori lagunari tra le due guerre
2005	Piassola sul Brenta	Continuità - Rassegna d’Arte Contemporanea dal Novecento ad Oggi
2007	Eraclea	Dietro il Paesaggio (I Luoghi dell'anima della Pittura Contemporanea)
2008	Padua	Novecento al Museo. Per una Galleria d'Arte Contemporanea
2008	Torre di Mosto	Paesaggi Veneti. Una collezione in divenire
2010	Mira	Memorie di Paesaggio. Il "Veneto felice" nei suoi pittori del Novecento
2010	Torre di Mosto	Memorie di Paesaggio. Il "Veneto felice" nei suoi pittori del Novecento
2010	San Donà di Piave	La figura dipinta testimone del tempo: Da Venezia - Novati - Privato - Varagnolo
2010	Pieve di Soligo	Nel Paesaggio

== Further reading (in Italian) ==
- "Da Venezia, Vita ed Opere del Maestro" di Gino Damerini
- "E. Da Venezia, Vita ed Opere del Maestro" di Pietro Zampetti, Venezia 1968
- "Eugenio Da Venezia, Vita ed Opere del Maestro" di Paolo Rizzi. Edizione Galleria d'Arte Moderna Ravagnan - Venezia, September 1971
- "Mezzo Secolo di pittura nel Veneto", di Paolo Rizzi. All. Nr. 3 alla rivista Bolaffi Arte Nr. 72, Torino 09/1977
- Autori Vari, "Mostra Antologica", Bevilacqua La Masa Comune di Venezia, Venezia, 1968
- Autori Vari, "Eugenio Da Venezia. Retrospettiva Antologica 1926 - 1985", Comune di Abano Terme Assessorato alla Cultura, Conselve, 1985
- Eugenio Da Venezia, "Pensieri personali di Eugenio Da Venezia sull'Arte scritti tra il 1986/87", Official web site, interview section, Venezia, 2006
- "La Valigia ieri e oggi", di Bevilacqua La Masa Catalogo Mostra 02-22/10 -1982, presso Museo Cà Pesaro, Venezia
- "Eugenio Da Venezia. La donazione alla Querini Stampalia", Milano, Electa, 1990 - Catalogo Mostra 09/11 - 09/12 -1990, presso Palazzo Querini, Venezia
- Collana dei "Quaderni della Donazione Da Venezia", a cura di Giuseppina Dal Canton
