= Nadja Malacrida =

British writer, broadcaster, and socialite

- Marchesa Malacrida de Saint-August
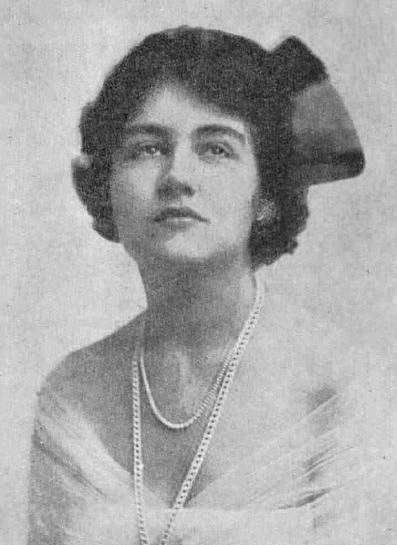
- Malacrida at the time of her marriage, 1922
- Born: Louisa Nadia Green; 15 June 1895; Hampstead, London, England
- Died: 3 October 1934 (aged 39); Henley-on-Thames, England
- Buried: Fairmile Cemetery, Henley-on-Thames
- Spouse: Piero Malacrida de Saint-August
- Occupation: writer; radio broadcaster; racing driver; socialite

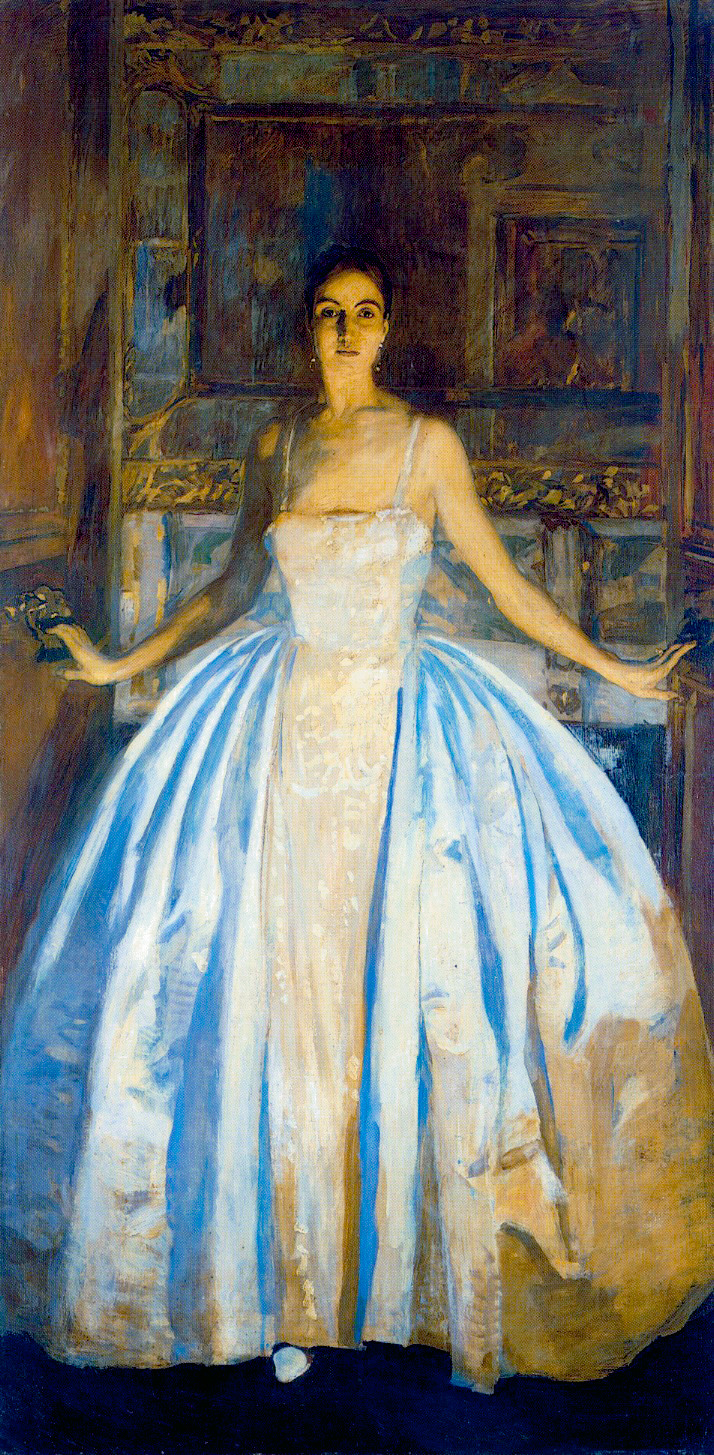
Ritratto dalla Marchesa Malacrida (1926) by Ettore Tito

Louisa, Marchesa Malacrida de Saint-August (née Louisa Nadia Green, 15 June 1895 – 3 October 1934), known by the pen names Nadja Malacrida and Nadja, was an English writer, radio broadcaster, racing driver, and socialite. A novelist, playwright, and poet, she published three books of war poetry during the First World War. An Italian aristocrat by marriage, she was a prominent figure of 20th-century London high society.

== Early life ==
Malacrida, an only child, was born on 15 June 1895 in Hampstead, London, to businessman Charles Edward Green and his wife, Louisa Cass. She grew up at Paddockhurst in Sussex, the country estate of her uncle and aunt, Weetman Pearson, Lord Cowdray (later Viscount) and Annie Pearson, Lady Cowdray.

== Career ==
Malacrida published her first collection of poems, Evergreen, at the age of fourteen. A second edition was published in 1912. During the War, she published three volumes of poetry: Love and War (1915), For Empire and other poems (1916) and The full heart (1919). Brian Murdoch finds Malacrida's war poetry "well worth rescuing from the obscurity of the lost voices" and sees some ambiguity in the long poem "For Empire" for which the collection For Empire and other poems is named, with "very little of the patriotic tonality left". She donated the proceeds of her war poetry to two First World War charities that still exist as of 2019: St. Dunstan's, a home for soldiers blinded in the war, now with a wider remit under the name Blind Veterans UK, and the Star and Garter Home for Disabled Soldiers, now the Royal Star and Garter Home, Richmond.

Malacrida and her husband collaborated writing two lightly disguised romans à clef about the London society scene, using the pseudonym P. N. Piermarini: Life Begins To-Day (1923) and Footprints on the Sand (1924). She also wrote a play, Cheque Mate, in 1932, using the masculine pen name Lewis Hope.

Malacrida took part in an early John Logie Baird television broadcast in 1933, and in 1934, the last year of her life, she frequently read mostly Victorian prose excerpts and poetry on BBC radio, under the name Nadja Green. She also appeared in a national newspaper advertising campaign for Vim household cleaner, where she was quoted as explaining that it was "no use having new ideas of decoration if you have old ideas of dirt" and contrasting the dusty hangings and bric-à-brac of the Victorian era with the simple, spare modern interiors, which must be kept clean because "every speck and spot is glaringly obvious".

== Personal life ==
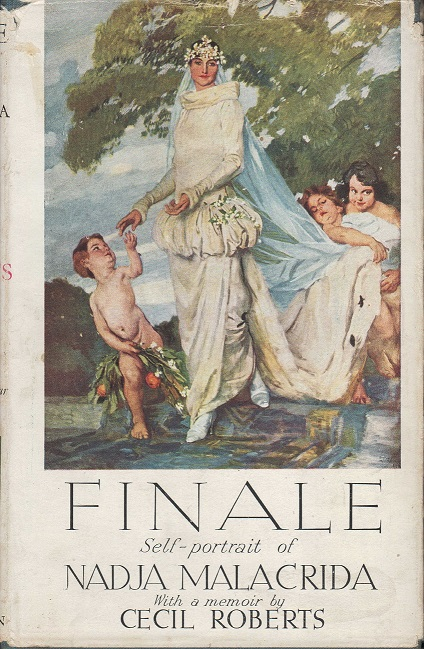
Cover of Finale. The same image was used as the frontispiece, captioned "From the painting by Ettore Tito in the library of Duneckt House, Aberdeenshire." That house was also owned by the Cowdrays.

In June 1921, Malacrida met her future husband, Marchese Piero Malacrida de Saint-August, an Italian journalist and former cavalry officer, at a charitable fundraising event known as Alexandra Rose Day at The Ritz Hotel, London. They were married on 6 December 1922, at St Bartholomew-the-Great, making her the Marchesa Malacrida de Saint-August. Her husband's family were a noble family from Lombardy. Shortly after their wedding, her husband expanded his activities into writing on interior design, and designing interiors, especially luxury bathrooms, for the upper class. The couple would buy flats at smart London addresses, then remodel and sell them, trading under the name "Olivotti". In 1926–1929, they lived at 4 Upper Brook Street, Mayfair.

The Malacridas were celebrities of their time, appearing at all the big society functions, and much reported on in the newspapers of the day. The marriage was reportedly very happy. They wrote to each other every day when apart, and their correspondence during her final month was published as Finale. Self-portrait of Nadja Malacrida. after her death in 1934, including her memoir by the Malacridas' friend Cecil Roberts.

Her portrait in oil was painted in 1926 by Ettore Tito. It was donated by her husband to the Galleria Internazionale d’Arte Moderna in 1981, two years before his death. Another portrait, by Olive Snell, featured on the front cover of the 4 December 1929 issue of The Sketch.

== Death ==
On 3 October 1934, Malacrida was killed in a single-vehicle crash while driving, alone, back to London from Cecil Roberts' country cottage just outside Henley. Her car was going uphill when it left the slippery road and plunged down over a 35-foot embankment; she died instantly from a broken neck. Her body, thrown from the car, was discovered by the groundsman of the Henley Cricket Club while her pet spaniel was discovered later uninjured. She was an experienced and competent driver, who had driven a car for 20 years. The couple shared a love of fast driving and owned several vehicles including Hispano-Suiza, Mercedes and Isotta Fraschini, and she had previously driven at Brooklands motor racing circuit. She is buried at Fairmile Cemetery, Henley-on-Thames.
