= Corrado Ricci =

Italian art historian and archeologist

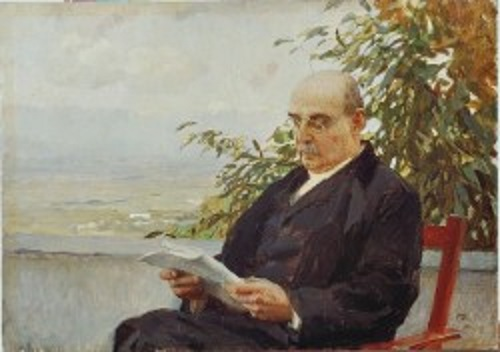
Portrait of Corrado Ricci by Ettore Tito

Corrado Ricci (18 April 1858 – 5 June 1934) was an Italian archeologist and art historian.

== Life ==
He was born in Ravenna. Ricci initially studied at the Lyceum and then the Academy of Fine Arts of Ravenna, then went to the University of Bologna to study law and humanities, while under the guidance of Giosuè Carducci.

During 1893-1894 Ricci served as director of the Pinacoteca of Parma, and from 1894 to 1898 he had that role at the Galleria Estense in Modena. In 1895-1897 he oversaw the special Superintendency of Monuments in Ravenna, and participated in some archeological investigations. In 1898 was named head of the Pinacoteca di Brera in Milan, and in 1903 he became the director of Museums and the Galleria Nazionale di Firenze.

In 1906, he was appointed General Director of the Ministry of Public Education. In 1910, he helped found the National Institute of Archaeology and Art History of Rome, and served as its chairman.

In 1918, he established, in Rome, the Istituto di Archeologia e Storia dell’Arte (Institute of Archaeology and History of Art), and remained its president until 1934. In 1921, he was inducted as a member of the Accademia dei Lincei. Ricci joined the Fascist party and was made senator in 1923, apparently until his death. In 1925, Ricci signed a Manifesto of Fascist Intellectuals, drafted by Giovanni Gentile. Under the rule of Mussolini, who exalted the ties of the Italian state to Ancient Rome, Ricci was able to pursue major archeologic and restoration projects, including excavations of the Imperial Fora and the construction of Via dell’Impero (today Via dei Fori Imperiali), the recovery of the Roman ships of Lake Nemi, and the restoration of Palazzo Venezia, which was made the seat of the Istituto di Archeologia e Storia dell’Arte in 1922.

== Works ==
He was prolific in his writing on both art history, but also historical fiction and art criticism.

- I primordi dello studio bolognese: Nota storica di Corrado Ricci, 1887
- Antonio Allegri Da Corregio: His Life, His Friends, and His Time, 1896
- Michelangelo, 1900
- Pintoricchio (Bernardino Di Betto of Perugia), 1902
- Ravenna, 1907
- Art in Northern Italy, 1911
- Baroque Architecture and Sculpture in Italy, 1912
- Baukunst und Dekorative Plastik der Hoch- und Spät-Renaissance in Italien, 1923
- Beatrice Cenci, 1925
- Romanesque Architecture in Italy
- L' Arte Dei Bambini
- North Italian Painting of the Cinquecento: Piedmont,
