= Piero Malacrida de Saint-August =

Italian aristocrat, playboy and London-based interior designer

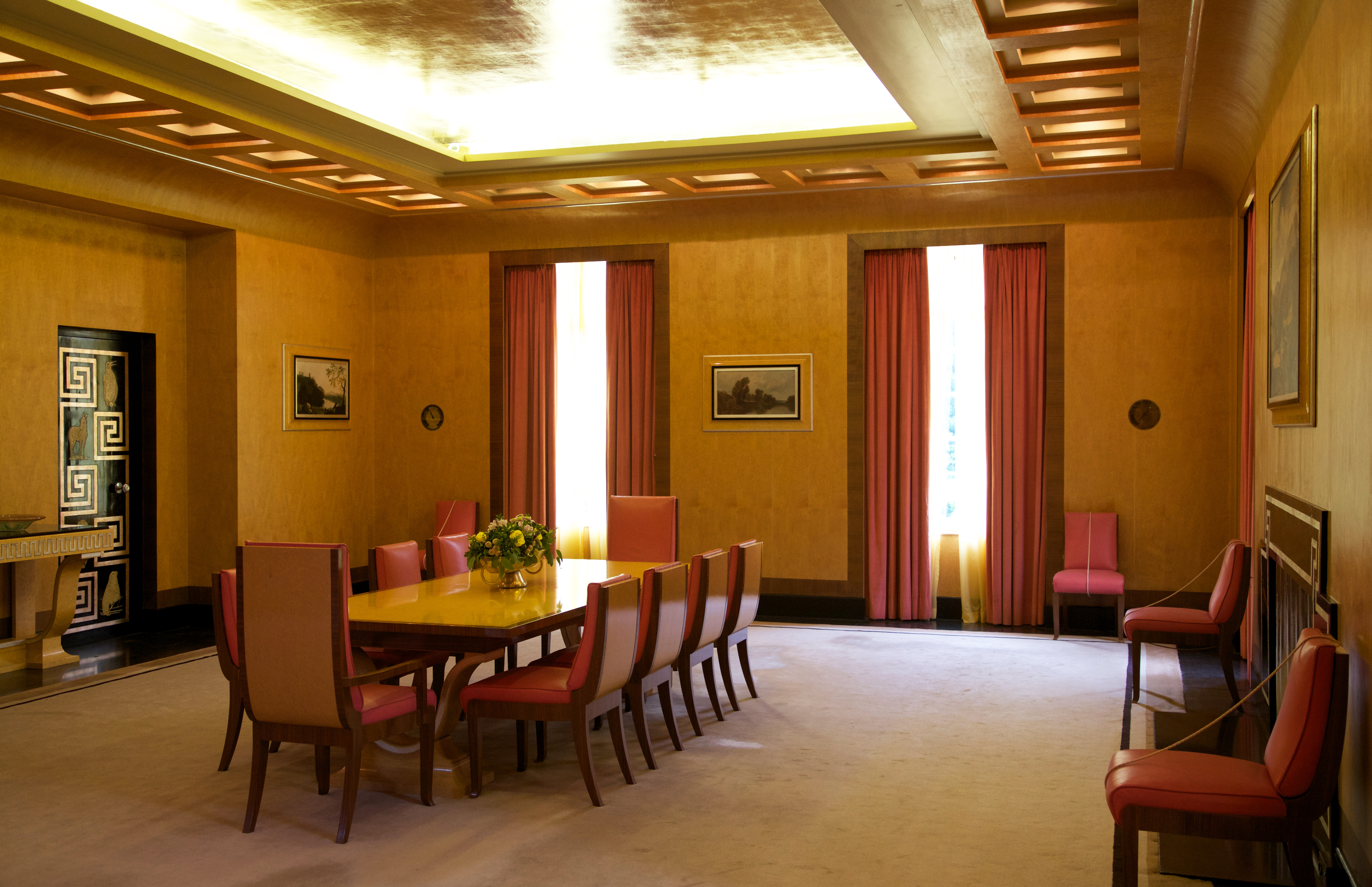
The Dining Room at Eltham Palace by Malacrida: Black marble and ebonised panels with geometric marquetry inlays.

Marchese Piero Luigi Carlo Maria Malacrida de Saint-August (also known as Pier or Peter Malacrida; 1889–22 April 1983) was an Italian aristocrat, playboy and London-based interior designer. The Malacrida family were from Lombardy and a Palazzo Malacrida still exists in Morbegno, Lombardy. The property passed to another family in 1820 and is currently in the hands of the municipality.

Malacrida and his first wife, the poet Nadja Malacrida, were prominent socialites in London in the late 1920s and early 1930s. Piero Malacrida is best known for his interiors at Eltham Palace. Following the death of Nadja in 1934, Malacrida withdrew from public life, although he later remarried.

== Personal life ==
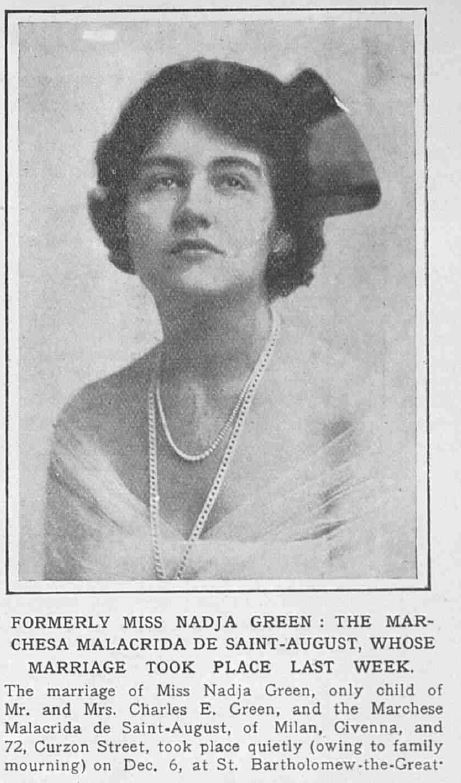
Malacrida's first wife, Nadja. A wedding photo, published in The Sketch, 13 December 1922

Malacrida was a former cavalry officer who had studied Engineering at the University of Leeds. On 6 December 1922, he married an Englishwoman, Louisa Nadia Green, at St Bartholomew-the-Great. She was a niece of Lord Cowdray, usually known by her pen name of Nadja. She was a prominent socialite and literary celebrity in 1920s London. Known not only for her looks, charm and intelligence; she was also a BBC radio broadcaster, an aviator, racing driver, poet and set designer. She is best known today as a World War I poet.

The couple lived in a large and luxurious flat in Grosvenor Street and a country house at East Molesey, where they entertained many of the leading literary and artistic figures of the day. As a result of their numerous accomplishments and connections the couple acquired a certain glamour and were frequently mentioned in society gossip columns and the court pages of the London newspapers. In addition, Malacrida himself frequently wrote articles on design for international publications such as Vogue. All this brought him to the attention of wealthy clients and patrons.

The marriage is reported to have been happy; when apart, they wrote to each other daily. Each pursued their own hobbies independently while sharing many common interests and collaborating on some of their written works; however, both professed to not being natural authors.

== Ethos ==
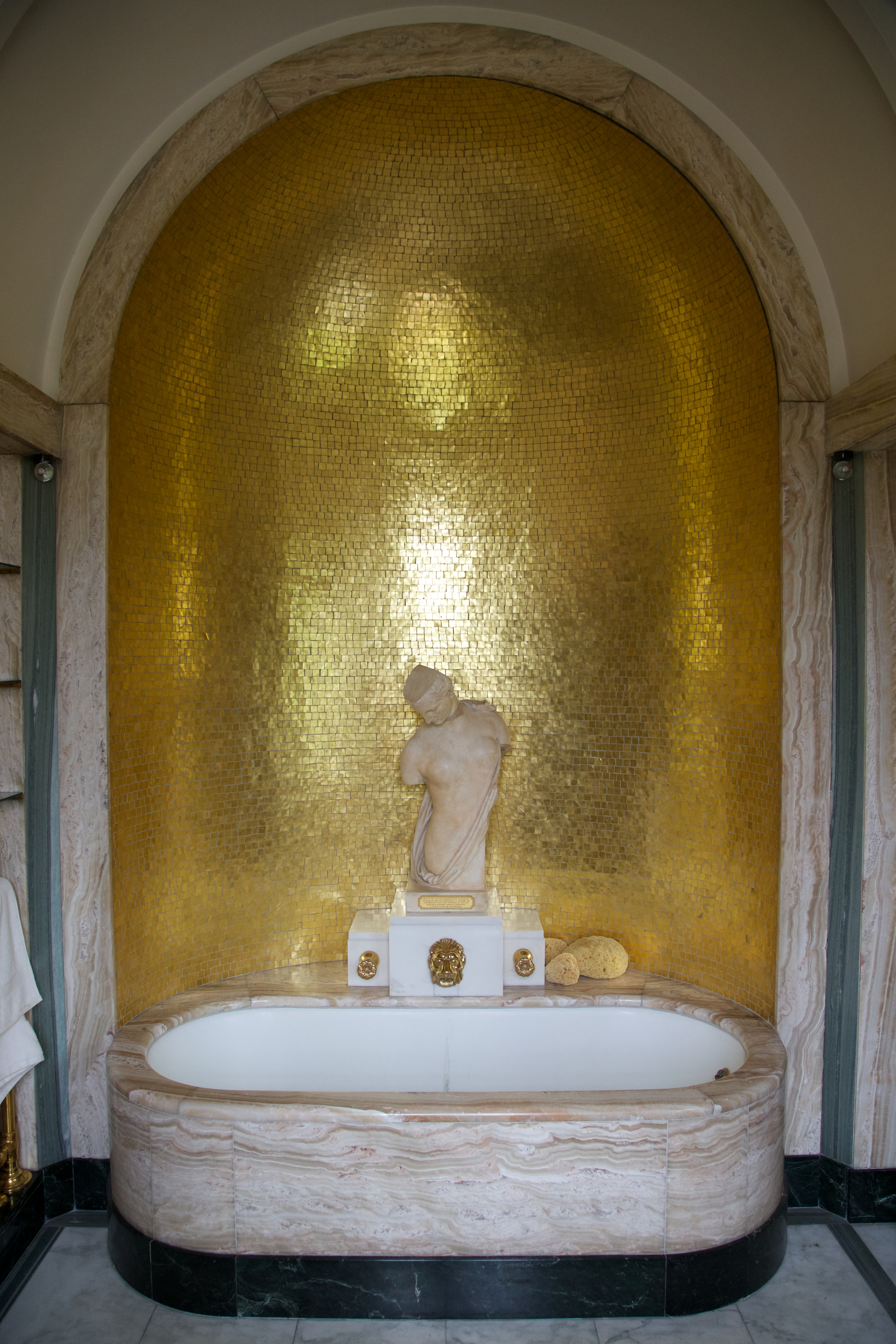
A temple-like bathroom at Eltham Palace

Writing in the late 1920s, Malacrida rejected the then-current concepts of interior design; he specifically criticised what he described as the "cottagey-inglenook-pickled oak school" and also the "walnutty Queen-Annish style" then in vogue, describing them as "locked in the past". The former style was later to be described by the architectural historian, Osbert Lancaster, as Stockbroker Tudor. Malacrida, though, was not beyond drawing upon medieval and Gothic motifs as was obvious in his design for a staircase hall in Upper Brook Street, London. There, bare stone walls were adorned with medieval wooden figures and Venetian bucentaur lanterns while the room itself is covered by a trompe-l'œil ceiling depicting leaves against a sky.

Malacrida's early works mostly drew on classicism for inspiration, often designing circular or semi-circular columned rooms in the manner of temples. Such was the bathroom he designed in 1932 for Samuel Courtauld, in a house - now a Grade II* listed building - at 12 North Audley Street, Westminster, which not only had columns, but also painted feature panels by Rex Whistler. Another bathroom design, "in the Pompeian style", with walls of red marble, commissioned in 1922 by Samuel Courtauld was for a suite, now known as the "Lady Islington suite", in Home House, Portman Square. The Audley Street work and an article by Malacrida in a 1928 edition of Vogue show his designs to be very much in the style that Osbert Lancaster was to describe as Curzon Street Baroque. The Vogue article shows the ecclesiastical niches and prie-dieux, large feature paintings and trompe-l'œil which were the hallmarks of that style.

By the early 1930s, Malacrida's work had become a pared back, streamlined form of Art Deco which never quite fully embraced Modernism. Malacrida is best known for his interiors in the 1930s rebuilding of Eltham Palace for Stephen Courtauld and his wife Virginia, Stephen was the brother of Malacrida's earlier client, Samuel Courtauld.

Today, few of Malacrida's works survive. Those that do include Eltham Palace and the bathrooms at North Audley Street and Home House.

== Withdrawal from public life ==
Piero Malacrida de Saint-August has been described as mysterious. This is because he arrived suddenly on the London high society social scene in the early 1920s and his work and social activities, along with those of his even better known wife, were almost instantly and incessantly reported in the press. Then, almost as suddenly as he appeared, he disappeared.

His departure from public life was precipitated by the death of his wife in an unexplained motor accident in 1934. Driving alone, she was returning to London from a weekend in the country when her car left the road and plunged down an embankment, she died instantly from a broken neck. A love of speed was a mutual passion the couple had shared; they had owned a series of fast cars including Hispano-Suiza, Mercedes and Isotta Fraschini. Following his bereavement, Malacrida immediately left London for a month, eventually returning only to complete his work at Eltham Palace.

In 1935, he published Finale. Self-portrait of Nadja Malacrida, this included a memoir of Nadja by Cecil Roberts, a close friend of the couple. The book was a tribute to his late wife and contained letters the two had sent each other in the month before her death. In the book he provided some details about his life prior to his marriage. He appears to have been an Italian army pilot during the First World War and says "Did I know Ljubljana, Leibach as it was known in the old days? I said I did, though I had never actually been there; but it was one of my flying objectives during the war, when I had a spell of bombing in the old Caproni." After the war he was a newspaper correspondent. In the 18 months between first meeting Nadja and their engagement he was abroad a great deal: "Northcliffe, my Lord and Master, packed me off to Helsingfors, where I was to collect some news from Kronstadt, and chat with as many Russian princesses as I could possibly bag, in the picturesquee camouflage of the latest fugitives from Soviet Russia. Peasant dress and ropes of pearls do you remember? After that I actually managed to get into Russia, and then went on to Poland, and then, after three days in London, on again somewhere in the Balkans. Then back to Poland once more." After his return to London and second meeting with Nadja (an afternoon at Kew) he was obliged to travel again: "the next day I left for America, where I had to attend the Washington Conference, with a spectacular and grossly overpaid job for some American newspaper combine."

On his own account, the marriage was characterised by extravagant expenditure: "We bought a plane, though financially and otherwise we had no business to, and both flew a good deal, everywhere, together and separately. We had some fierce cars, and some quite nice houses we could not afford but somehow did." He sold his library of rare books at auction in 1935.

In 1940 Malacrida returned to Italy to fight for Mussolini in the war. He later retired to live in Ireland.

Sometime in the early 1950s Malacrida remarried. His second wife, May (née Murphy) of Clonmel was a widow – her husband, Bernard Culhane, died on 29 December 1949 in a Dublin nursing home. In 1951 Peter and May purchased "Correen", a large mansion at 42 Ailesbury Road, Donnybrook, Dublin. Much of the contents of the mansion were sold at auction in 1963. The mansion was subsequently demolished and the facades of 80, 82, 84 Ailesbury Road were combined to make a replica of the original mansion facade.

Malacrida died in 1983. The Irish Independent of 23 April 1983 has a short death notice – 'peacefully in a Dublin nursing home in his 95th year. The Marchese Peter M., beloved husband of May, Shrewsbury Road, Dublin 4.' He is buried in Deansgrange Cemetery. May Malacrida died later that year, on 11 September 1983 at 28 Shrewsbury Road, Dublin 4. The site of the original "Correen" mansion was on the corner of Shrewsbury and Ailesbury Roads, and the newer, more modest house at 28 Shewsbury Road may therefore have been the subsequent home of the couple after it was sold, built on part of the original mansion site.

In his will, he bequeathed a clock, once owned by Napoleon's mother, Letizia Ramolino, to the Irish State. His Grant of Probate proved his wealth at just £11,000 at the time of his death.

== Bibliography ==
- Roberts, Cecil (1935). Finale. Self-portrait of Nadja Malacrida. London: Hutchinson & Co. OCLC 561516208.
- Tinniswood, Adrian (2016). The Long Weekend: Life in the English Country House Between The Wars. Random House. ISBN 978-1448191246.
- Lancaster, Osbert (1939). Homes Sweet Homes. John Murray Publishers. ISBN 978-0719507854.
- Lancaster, Osbert (1938). Pillar to Post: The Pocket Lamp of Architecture. London: John Murray. OCLC 932898972.
- World of Nadja Malacrida Retrieved 7 September 2019
- Marchese Malacrida (13 October 1928). "Modern Tendencies in Decoration". Vogue. pp. 98–100.
- The Architecture of the Estate: Modern Times British History Online. Published by London County Council, London, 1977. Retrieved 9 September 2019
- "Clock that belonged to Napoleon's mother inherited by State in 1984". The Irish Times. 27 December 2014.
- 1963 Sale catalogue of Marchese and Marchesa Malacrida's furniture Catalogue of French and Italian Period Furniture. Publisher: James Adam, Dublin. Publication Date: 1963. Publisher: James Adam & sons, Dublin (auctioneer). Publication Date: 1963. Retrieved 9 September 2019
- 1963 Dublin Grand Opera Society Spring Brochure Retrieved 9 September 2019
- Female Poets of The First World War Nadja Malacrida (1896 - 1934). Retrieved 9 September 2019
- Almanacco Della Provincia Di Como, Volume 1
- Almanacco reale per l'anno bisestile MDCCCVIII (1808), Volume 1
