= And So to Bath =

1940 novel by Cecil Roberts

First edition (publ. Hodder & Stoughton)

And So to Bath is a novel by Cecil Roberts first published in 1940.

Roberts lived in Oxfordshire and was familiar with the Old Bath Road as far as Maidenhead at which point he would turn off.

== Plot ==
After meeting the apocryphal Austrian Rudolph, Roberts has a revelation that there is an untold story of the old coaching route. Rudolph visits Roberts in London wishing to see the house of Samuel Richardson in Hammersmith. Together they find a hidden gem and this and Rudolph's naive belief that the signs "To Bath" indicate swimming-pools spur Roberts on to take the road to Bath. He takes three months for the journey (instead of the three hours it can be motored in) and gives potted histories of the people and places en route.

These include people such as Alfred Guillaume Gabriel, Count D'Orsay and Sir William Herschel, and places including Kensington, Brentford, Slough, Newbury and Calne.
