= Palazzo D'Anna Viaro Martinengo Volpi di Misurata =

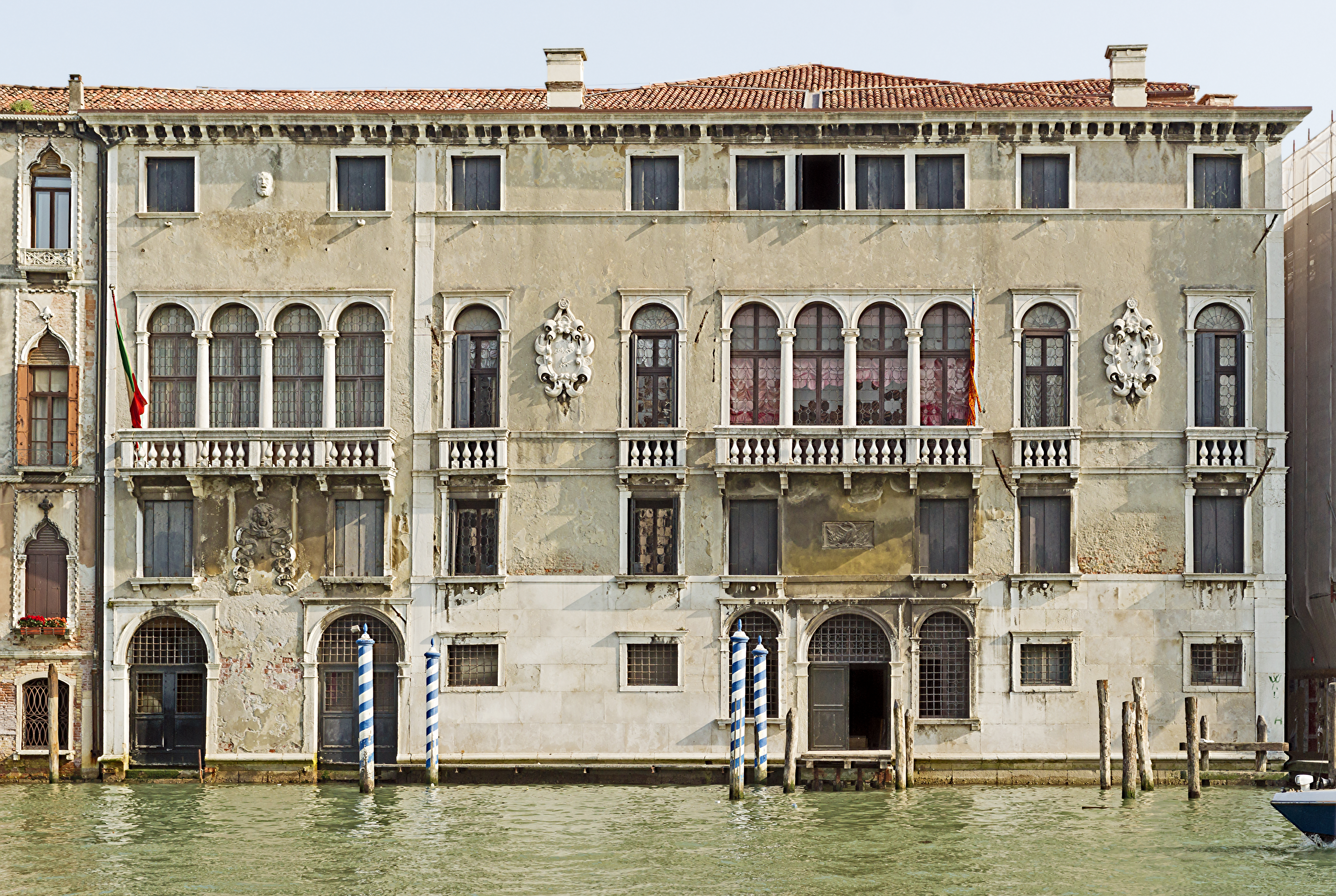
- Palazzo d'Anna; facade on Grand Canal.
- Interactive map of the Palazzo D'Anna Viaro Martinengo Volpi di Misurata area
- Alternative names: Palazzo D'Anna, Palazzo Talenti D'Anna Volpi

General information
- Type: Residential
- Architectural style: Renaissance
- Location: San Marco district, Venice, Italy
- Coordinates: 45°26′09.29″N 12°19′55.55″E
- Construction stopped: before 1529
- Owner: the Volpi family

Technical details
- Floor count: 4

Palazzo D'Anna Viaro Martinengo Volpi di Misurata, also known as Palazzo Talenti D'Anna Volpi, is a Renaissance palace in Venice, Italy, located in the San Marco district, overlooking the left side of the Grand Canal, between Palazzo Tron and Casa Marinoni and opposite of Palazzo Donà a Sant'Aponal.

== History ==
The palace has changed many owners during its history, hence its multipart name. Built in the early 16th century by the Talenti family, the palazzo was soon sold to the rich Flemish merchant Martino D'Anna (van Haanen). In the middle of the 17th century, the subsequent owners, the Viaros, an ancient and noble Venetian family, expanded the structure. During the 18th century, the building changed hands again, first inherited by the Venetian patricians Foscarinis and later by the Martinengo counts of Brescian origin. In the 19th century, the palazzo became the property of Count Giovanni Conti who ordered the building to be a retirement home after his death. In 1917, the entrepreneur Giuseppe Volpi became its owner, and, since 1925, was awarded the title of Count of Misurata. The palazzo is still owned by the Volpi family.

== Architecture ==
At the first sight, the facade of the building seems to be divided into four vertical sections with two alternating structural typologies, but, by looking more closely, one notices that the leftmost section was added to the existing building at a later time.

The original palace is built in Renaissance style common to many other buildings in the lagoon city. The stone-clad ground floor has a central water portal, with the mezzanine level being much higher than the norm. The structure further develops into a single noble floor decorated by a central quadrifora and a balcony. The side parts have a pair of single-light windows of the same style also with balconies. The walls of the noble floor are decorated with coats of arms in bas-relief. The façade terminates with the attic level decorated with square windows of the same layout. The noble floor and the attic are divided by a string course cornice and a wide band of plaster that originally featured frescos by Giovanni Antonio da Pordenone, which has now completely disappeared. It is said that in 1529 Michelangelo had come to Venice to admire and study these frescoes.

The added leftmost part of the building almost completely mimics the central part of the building, except for the presence of two water portals and only two windows in the attic level with a large gargoyle head between them.

The interiors of the noble floor is opulent thanks to the presence of vintage furniture and paintings. The floor is accessed through the grand staircase leading from the entrance hall to the ground floor to the portego of the main floor. The ceiling of the great ballroom was frescoed by the painter Ettore Tito. Its frieze contains the names of the victorious battles of the Italian army in Tripolitania during the war in Africa, as a reference of Volpi's governorate there between 1921 and 1925.
