= Giuseppe Volpi =

Italian businessman and politician

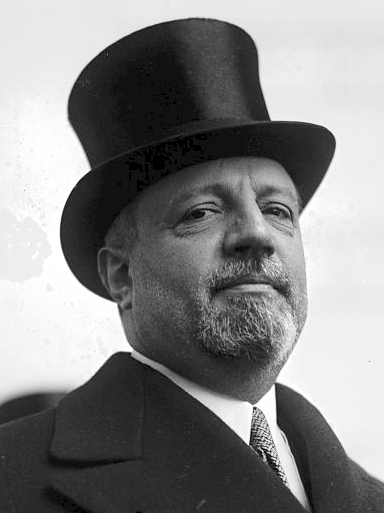
- Volpi in 1925

Minister of Finance
- In office 10 July 1925 – 9 July 1928
- Prime Minister: Benito Mussolini
- Preceded by: Alberto De Stefani
- Succeeded by: Antonio Mosconi

Governor of Tripolitania
- In office 16 July 1921 – 3 July 1925
- Preceded by: Luigi Mercatelli
- Succeeded by: Emilio De Bono

Member of the Senate of the Kingdom
- In office 18 November 1922 – 5 August 1943
- Appointed by: Victor Emmanuel III

Personal details
- Born: 19 November 1877 Venice, Kingdom of Italy
- Died: 16 November 1947 (aged 69) Rome, Italy
- Resting place: Santa Maria Gloriosa dei Frari
- Party: PNF

Giuseppe Volpi, 1st Count of Misurata (19 November 1877 – 16 November 1947) was an Italian businessman and politician.

== Biography ==
Count Volpi developed utilities, which had brought electricity to Venice, northeastern Italy and the Balkans by 1903. This was most notably Società Adriatica di Elettricità (the Adriatic Electricity Company, or SADE) it. In 1911–1912, he acted as a negotiator in ending the Italo-Turkish War (Treaty of Lausanne 1912). He was the governor of the colony of Tripolitania from 1921 until 1925, and was backed by Mussolini in his approach to military pacification in the region.

As the Kingdom of Italy's Minister of Finance from 1925 until 1928, Volpi successfully negotiated Italy's World War I debt repayment with the United States and with the United Kingdom, pegged the value of the lira to the value of gold, and implemented free trade policies. He was replaced in July 1928 by Antonio Mosconi. He was First Procurator of Saint Mark's, an influential position in Venice, from 1927 to 1947, involving the protection and historic preservation of Piazza San Marco and Saint Mark's Basilica.

In 1928, he founded the Venice Lido golf club, where Hitler and Mussolini famously met in 1934. In 1932, he founded the Venice Film Festival.

Volpi was president of the Confindustria from 1934 to 1943. He was removed from this position and expelled from the Grand Council of Fascism after he opposed the continuing of the war and Italy's alliance with Hitler. He was arrested by the SS after trying to escape to Switzerland.

After the war, as France and Italy had condemned him as a fascist co-conspirator, he fled to Switzerland where many fascists went into hiding after the war. He underwent a series of legal proceedings for his responsibilities during the fascist regime after the war. His illness prevented him from appearing before the judges, but, thanks to the Togliatti amnesty he was acquitted of all charges, after a life spent at the top of the Fascist Party.

== Private life ==
His son is the former automobile racing manager and Formula One team owner Giovanni Volpi (b. 1938).

His granddaughter via his daughter Countess Annamaria Volpi di Misurata was Countess Marina Cicogna (1934–2023) who The New York Times described as "the first major female Italian film producer" and "one of the most powerful women in European cinema".

== Gallery ==
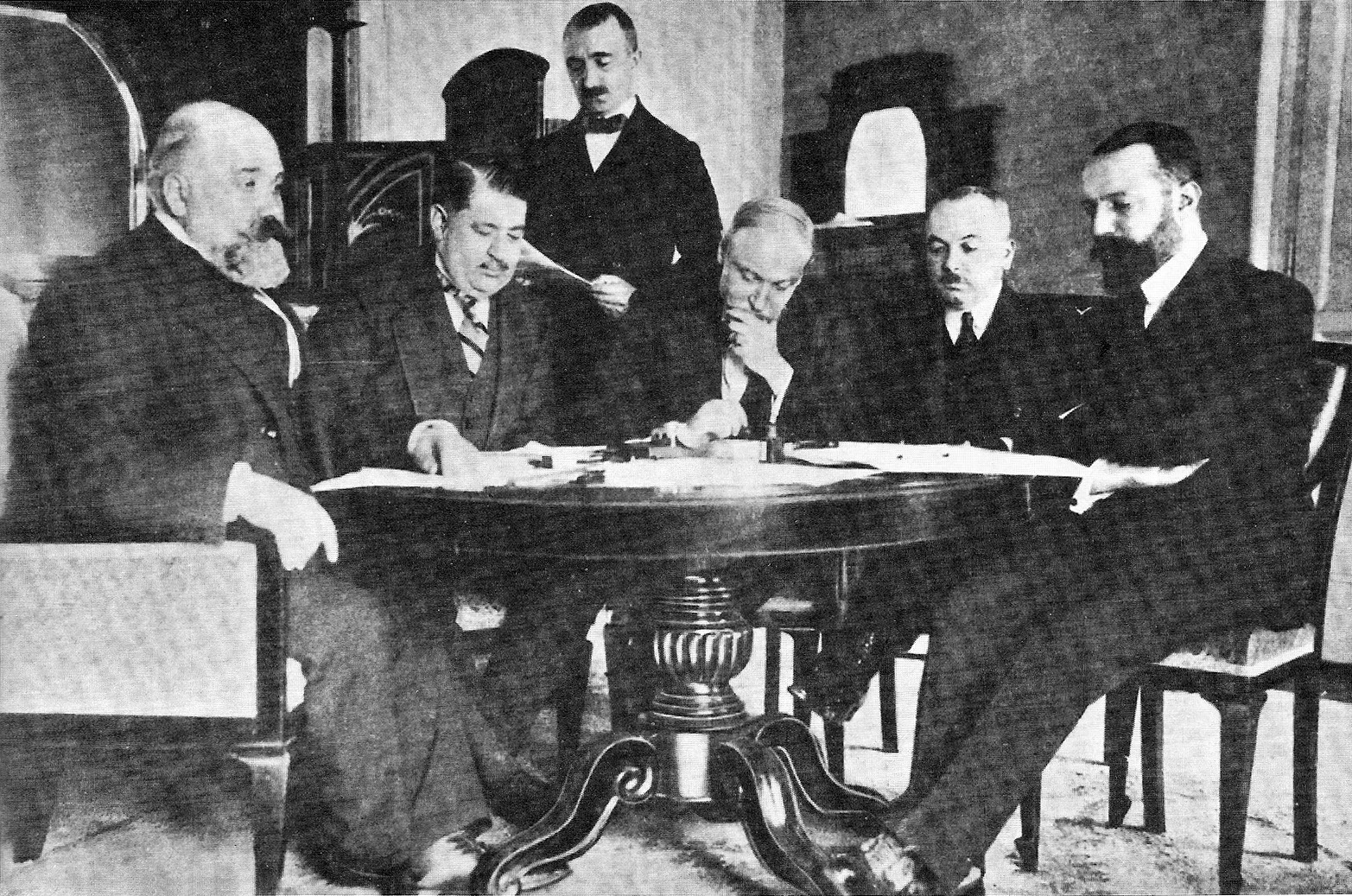
Treaty of Lausanne 1912. Volpi stands on the far right.

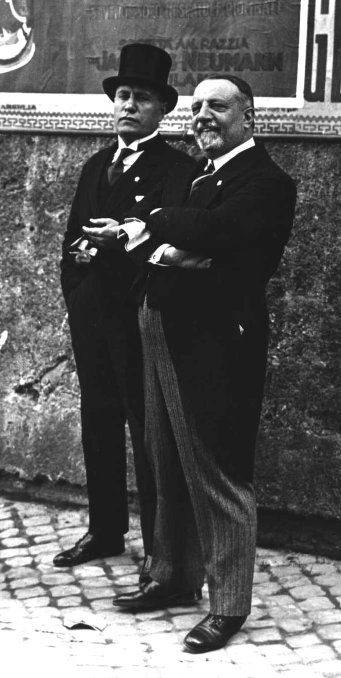
Volpi and Mussolini, 1925–28

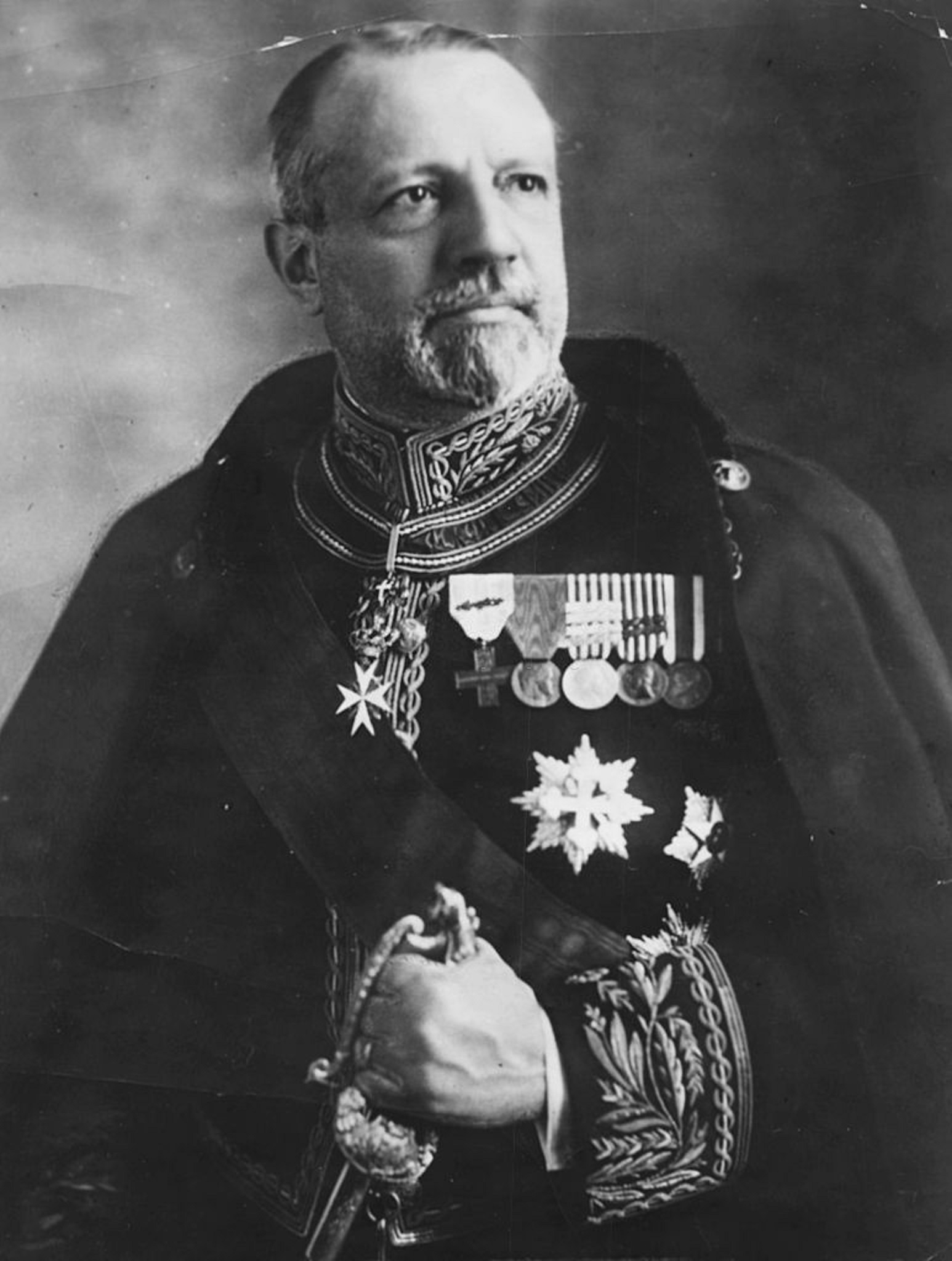
In military uniform 1925.

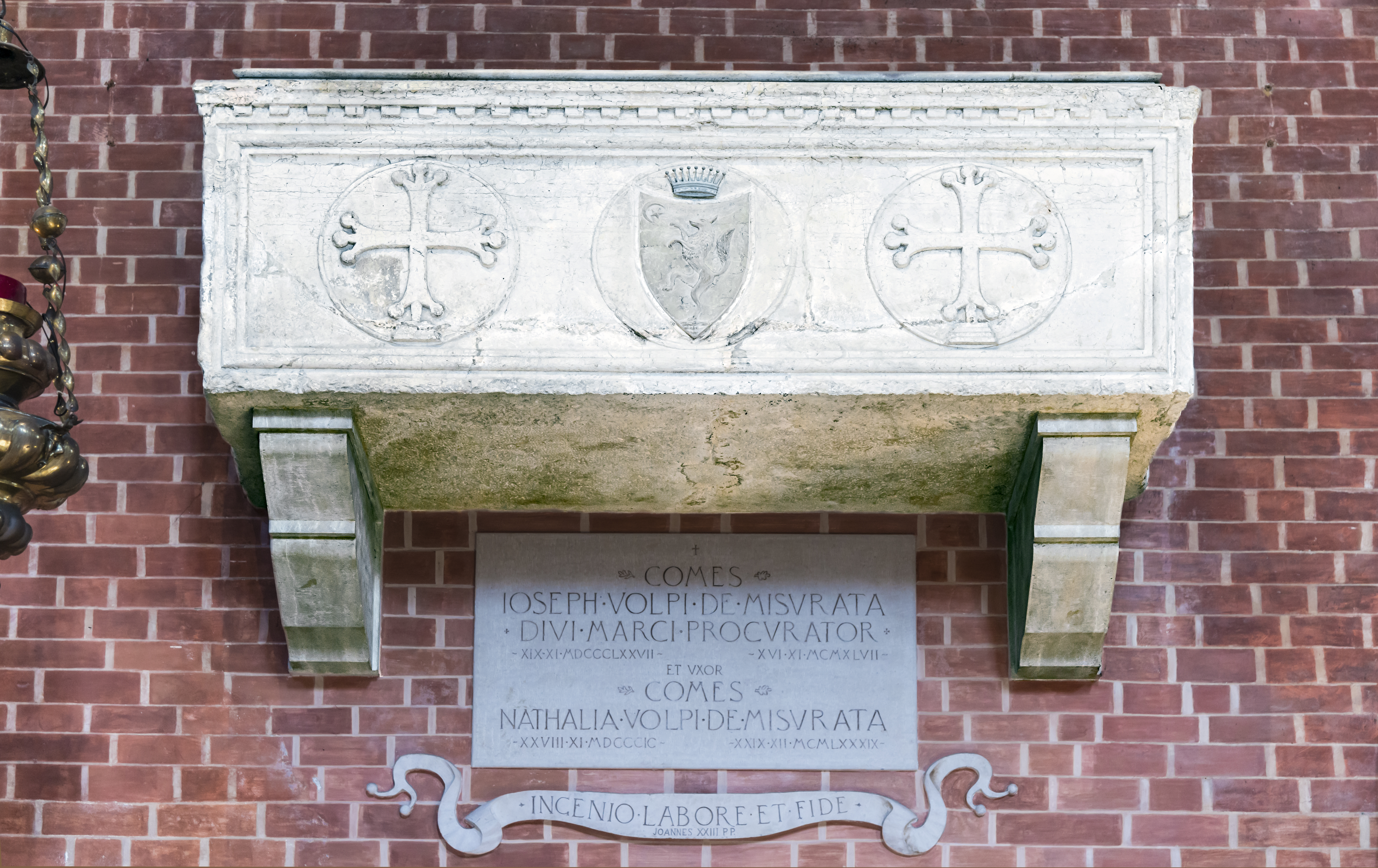
Tomb in Santa Maria Gloriosa dei Frari

== See also ==
- Palazzo D'Anna Viaro Martinengo Volpi di Misurata
- Armando Brasini

== Notes ==
Government offices
Preceded by Luigi Mercatelli	Governor of Tripolitana; 1921–1925	Succeeded by Emilio De Bono
Preceded by Alberto De Stefani	Italian Minister of Finance; 1925–1928	Succeeded by Antonio Mosconi
Business positions
Preceded by Alberto Pirelli	President of Confindustria; 1934–1943	Succeeded by Giovanni Balella
