= Cagnaccio di San Pietro =

Italian painter (1897–1946)

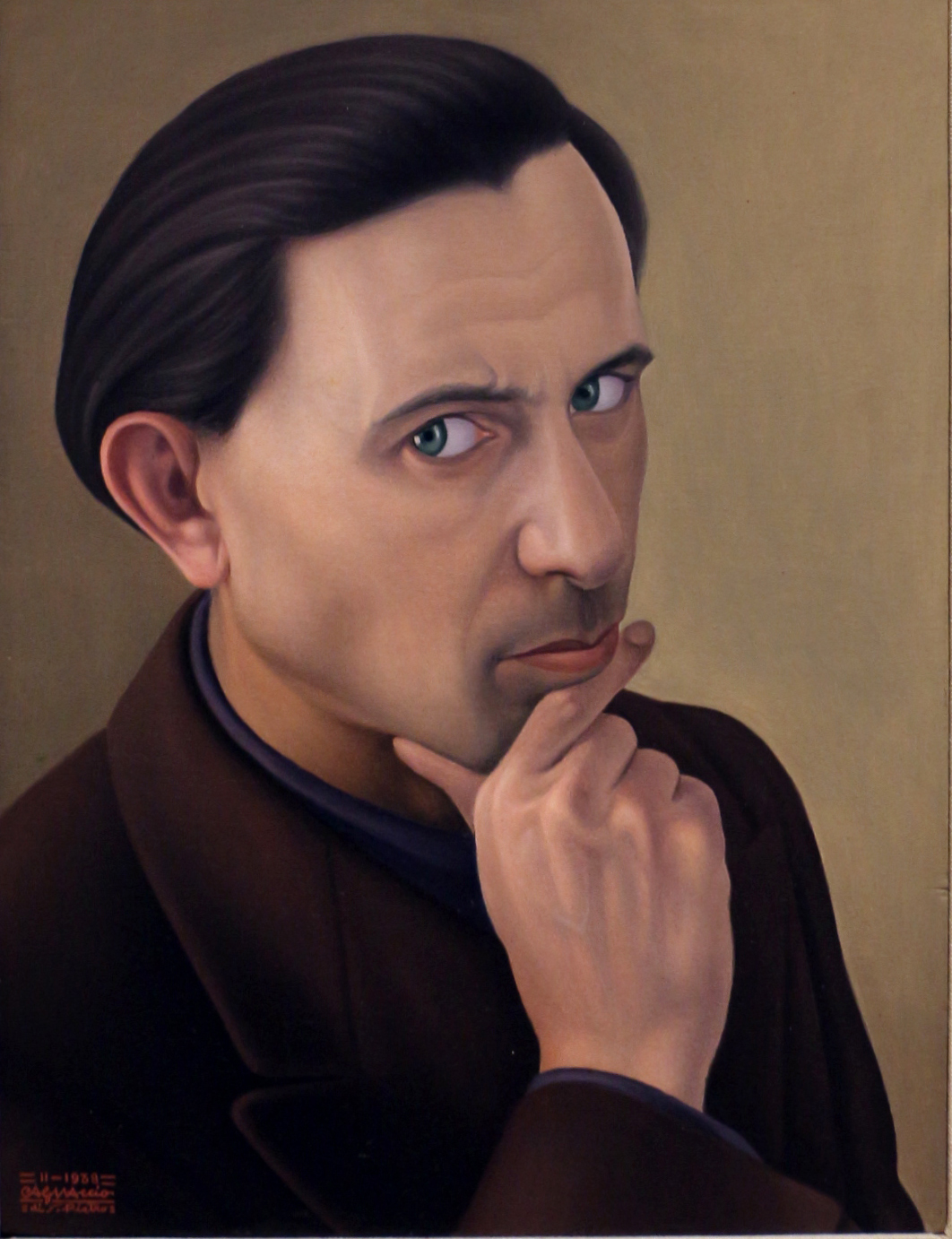
Autoritratto (1938), Ca' Pesaro

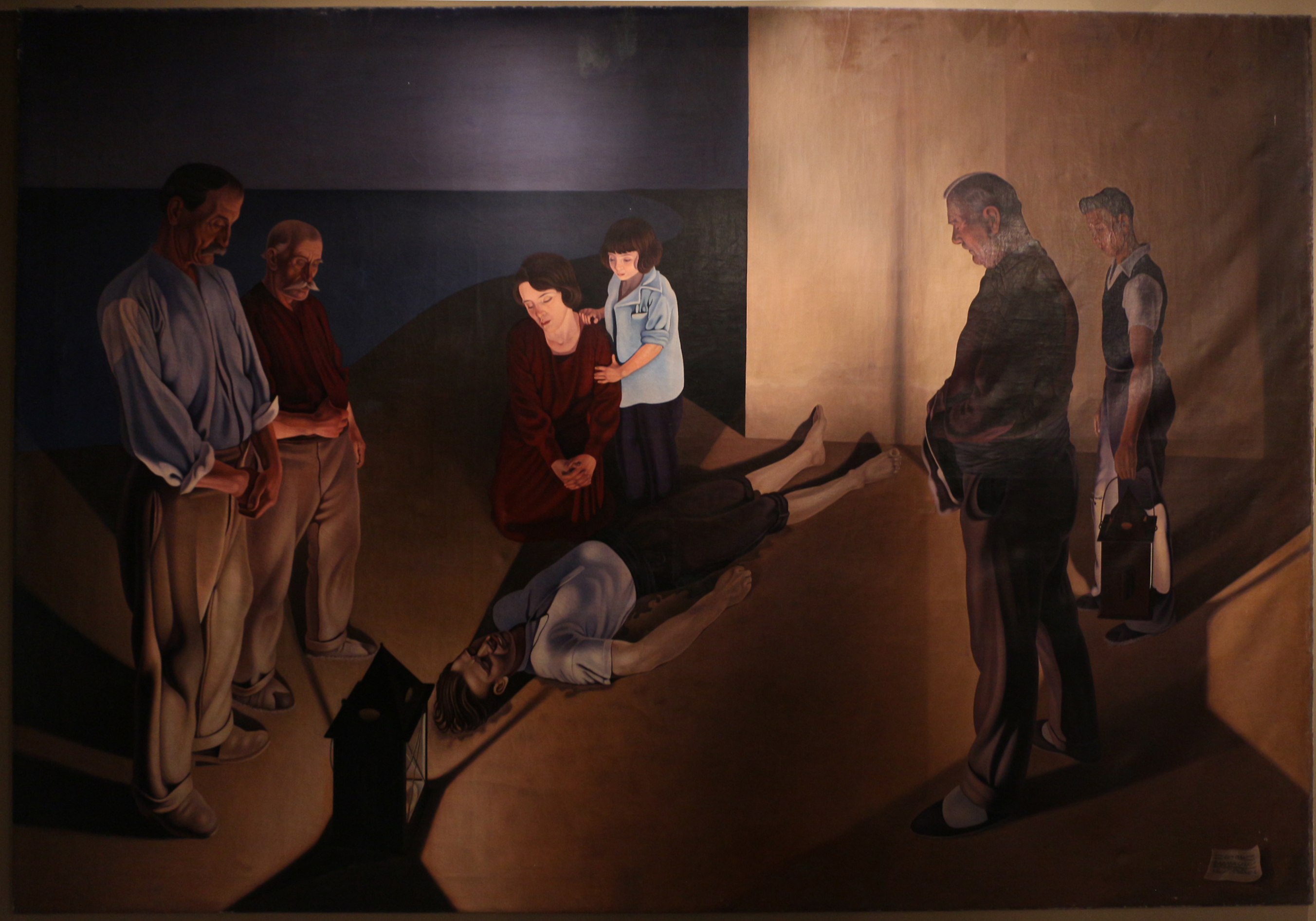
I Naufraghi, 1934, oil on canvas

Cagnaccio di San Pietro (January 14, 1897 – May 29, 1946), born Natale Bentivoglio Scarpa, was an Italian magic realist painter.

He was born in Desenzano del Garda. His artistic training was at the Academy of Fine Art in Venice, where he studied under Ettore Tito. Cagnaccio's early paintings were in a Futurist idiom, but by the early 1920s he had adopted a very smoothly brushed, nearly photographic style. His work, which includes portraits, nudes, still lifes, scenes of popular life, and religious pictures, shows the influence of the German painters of the New Objectivity.

One of his best-known paintings, After the Orgy (1928), shows three nude women (apparently the same model in three different poses) asleep on a floor littered with wine bottles, playing cards and cigarettes, with an effect "more depressing than titillating". The clinical realism of this work is also seen in his still lifes, which often represent crabs, lobsters, or glass objects that he painted with chilly precision. His health disintegrated in the 1940s, and he spent the war years hospitalized in Venice, where he died on May 29, 1946.
