= Cecil Roberts =

English writer (1892–1976)

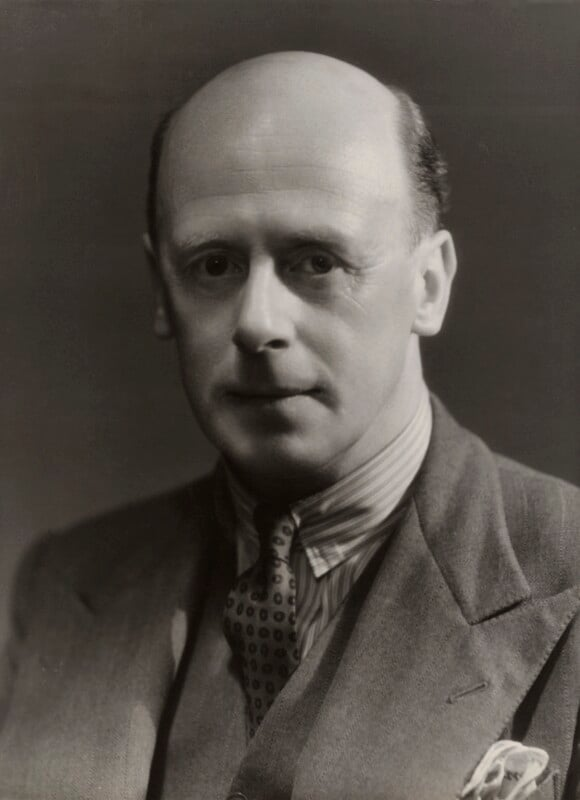
Roberts in 1939

Edric Cecil Mornington Roberts (18 May 1892 – 20 December 1976) was an English journalist, poet, dramatist and novelist. He was born and grew up in Nottingham.

== Working career ==
Roberts published his first volume of poems, with a preface by John Masefield, in 1913. He published his first novel, Scissors, in 1923. By the 1930s, Roberts was an established bestselling author. His work was translated into 12 languages.

He worked as a journalist on the Liverpool Post during the First World War, initially as literary editor, then as a war correspondent. For five years from 1920 he edited the daily Nottingham Journal. In 1922 he stood for Parliament for the Liberal Party. In the 1930s he reviewed books for The Sphere.

During the Second World War, Roberts worked for Lord Halifax, UK Ambassador to the United States.

Despite a prolific output and the popularity of his writings in his lifetime, they are almost wholly forgotten. His novels have been criticized for thin plots and cardboard characters, padded out with travel writing.

== Personal life ==
Roberts said that on coming of age he drew up a list of aims for his next 15 years, which included a solid career as a novelist, membership of Parliament, ownership of a country house and a London pied-à-terre, and marriage with two sons and a daughter. Some were achieved, but not the last. In private he claimed proudly to have been a lover of Laurence Olivier, Ivor Novello, Baron Gottfried von Cramm, Somerset Maugham, and Prince George, Duke of Kent. However, his autobiography is discreet: "I don't want any succès de scandale," he said, adding he was "nauseated by the striptease school of writers".

In later life Roberts's creative industry was impressive, but he gained repute as a name-dropping bore, the Canadian writer David Watmough dubbing him as "an irascible old fart". According to an obituary, his main personal trait was "magnetic egocentricity" – so fascinated by himself and his doings as to succeed uncannily in conveying that fascination to others, even against their will. Roberts's life often resembled a 20th-century grand tour, strewn with places in the sun, grand seigneurs and charming hostesses, with him as a fastidious literary pilgrim.

Roberts settled in Italy in the early 1950s, living in Alassio near Genoa, and then for many years in the Grand Hotel, Rome. He was awarded the Italian Gold Medal in 1966. He donated his papers to Churchill College, Cambridge in 1975. He died in Rome in 1976.

== Works ==
- Phyllistrata (1913)
- Through the Eyes of Youth (1914)
- The Youth of Beauty (1915)
- Collected War Poems (1916)
- The Chelsea Cherub (1917) novel
- Twenty-Six (1917)
- Charing Cross (1918)
- Training the Airmen (1919)
- Poems (1920)
- A Tale of Young Lovers (1922) poetic drama
- Scissors (1923) novel
- Sails of Sunset (1924) novel
- The Love Rack (1925) novel
- Little Mrs. Manington (1926) novel
- The Diary of Russell Beresford (1927) editor
- Sagusto (1927) novel
- David and Diana (1928) novel
- Goose Fair (1928)
- Indiana Jane (1929) novel
- Pamela's Spring Song (1929) novel (@)
- Goose Fair (1929)
- Havana Bound (1930) novel
- Spears Against Us (1930) novel (@)
- Bargain Basement (1931) novel
- Half Way: an autobiography (1931)
- Alfred Fripp (1932) biography
- Pilgrim Cottage (1933) trilogy: includes The Guests Arrive and Volcano (*)
- The Pilgrim Cottage Omnibus (*)
- Gone Rustic (1934) (*)
- The Guests Arrive (1934) (*)
- Volcano (1935) (*)
- Gone Rambling (1935) (*)
- Finale. Self-portrait of Nadja Malacrida. London: Hutchinson & Co. 1935. OCLC 561516208.
- Gone Afield (1936) (*)
- Gone Sunwards (1936) (*)
- Victoria, Four-Thirty (1937) novel (@)
- They Wanted to Live (1939) novel (@)
- And So to Bath (1940) (*)
- A Man Arose (1941) poem on Winston Churchill
- Letters from Jim (1941) editor
- One Small Candle (1942)
- So Immortal a Flower (1944)
- The Labyrinth (1944)
- And So to America (1946)
- Eight for Eternity (1947)
- And So to Rome (1950)
- A Terrace in the Sun (1951)
- One Year of Life (1952) memoir
- The Remarkable Young Man (1954)
- Portal to Paradise: an Italian excursion (1955)
- Love Is Like That (1957)
- Selected Poems (1960)
- Wide Is the Horizon (1962)
- Grand Cruise (1963)
- A Flight of Birds (1966)
- The Growing Boy (1967) autobiography (i)
- The Years of Promise autobiography (ii)
- The Bright Twenties (1970) autobiography (iii)
- Sunshine and Shadow (1972) autobiography (iv)
- Pleasant Years (1974) autobiography (v)
- Wings poem

(*)=The "Pilgrim Cottage" books (@)=The "Inside Europe" novels
