= Pietro Baseggio =

Italian architect and sculptor

Pietro Baseggio was a fourteenth-century architect and sculptor in Venice. In 1361, he was named superintendent of construction for the Doge's palace, and helped in construction along with Filippo Calendario.
