= Lattanzio da Rimini =

Italian painter, active 1492–1524

Lattanzio da Rimini (active 1492–1505) was an Italian painter primarily active in a Renaissance art style in Rimini and Venice.

He is documented as helping Giovanni Bellini in the decorations of the Hall of the Consiglio Maggior of the Doge's Palace in Venice. These frescoes were destroyed in the fire of 1577. A painting of the Madonna con il Bambino tra i ss. Giovanni Battista ed Elisabetta destroyed in Berlin in 1945.
