= Antonio da Ponte =

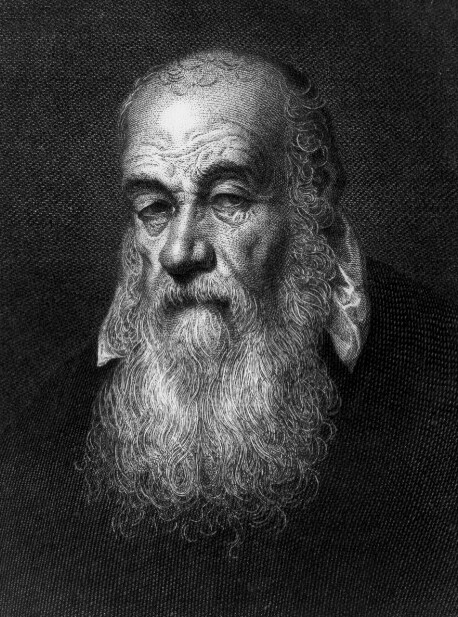
Engraving by Domenico Cunego after a contemporary portrait by Jacopo Bassano

Antonio da Ponte (1512–1597) was a Ticinese architect and engineer, most famous for his rebuilding of the Rialto Bridge in Venice.

Antonio Da Ponte was the head architect of the rebuilding of the Doge's Palace that was badly damaged by fire in 1574. Between 1588 and 1591 da Ponte rebuilt the Rialto Bridge to a design to which he had contributed. The design was selected in a 1587 contest held by the local authorities under Doge Pasquale Cicogna.

In the construction of this work, Antonio was helped by his nephew Antonio Contin, who would also later design the famous Bridge of Sighs (Ponte dei Sospiri). In 1841, the Parisian architect Antoine Rondelet wrote about the suspicious similarities between Antonio da Ponte's project and the one by Vincenzo Scamozzi.
