= Filippo Calendario =

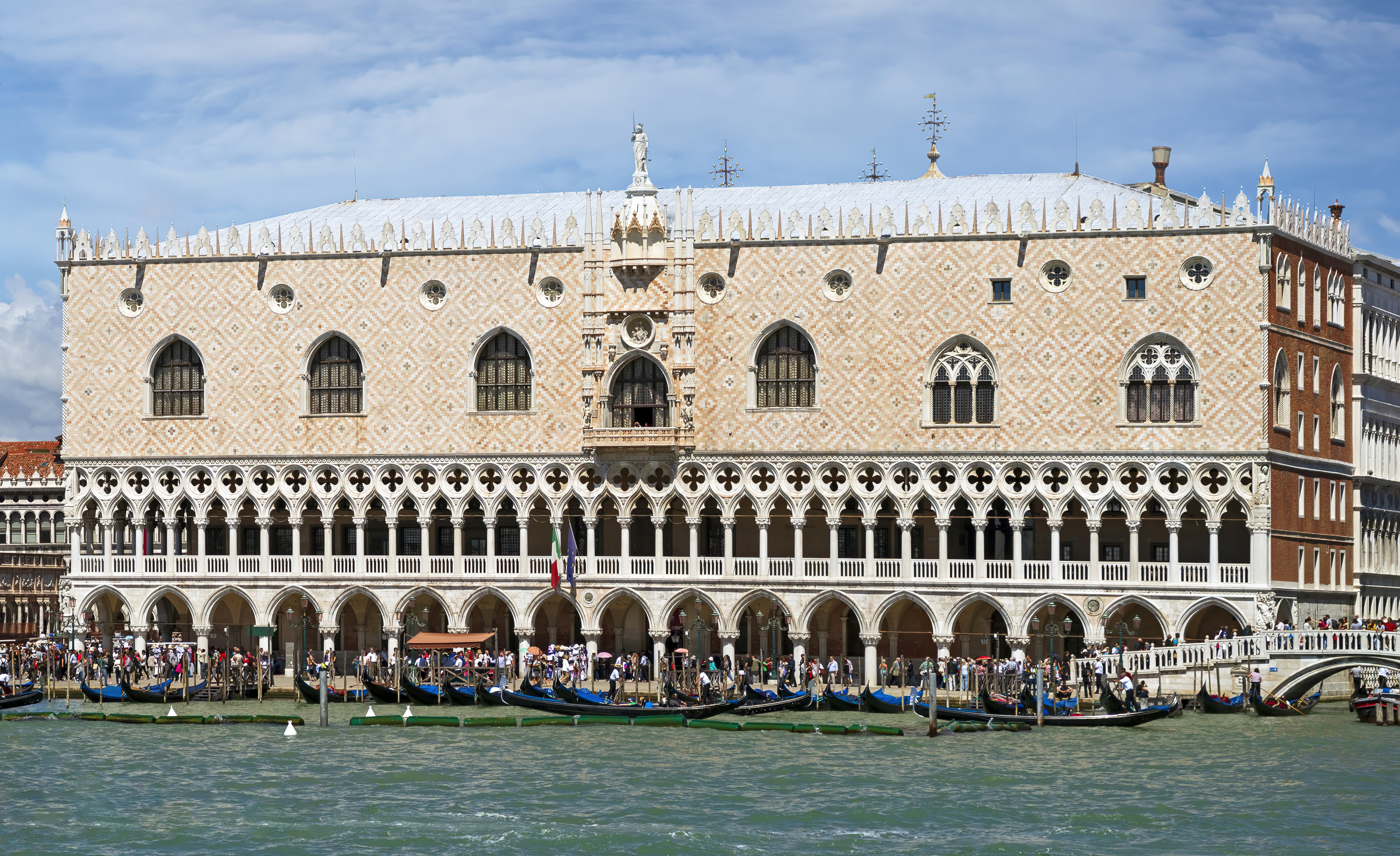
The facade of the Doge's Palace, Venice, clearly showing the two building phases.

Filippo Calendario (died 16 April 1355 in Venice, Italy) was an architect, a designer of the 14th century Doge's Palace, Venice. He was executed for treason.

== Design of Doge's Palace ==
By the end of the 13th century the existing Doge's Palace in Venice needed enlarging. Rebuilding commenced around 1340, though interrupted for several years because of the plague.

Calendario is attributed by some sources as the first architect or, at least, a collaborator. Calendario first appears in official records in 1340, when he is described as a master of two small boats, used to transport stone for construction. By 1341 he was the owner of five boats. This makes it likely he was also a stonemason.

The new building was in the Venetian Gothic style, low and squat to cope with the poor ground conditions. However, the Palace is noticeably built in two phases, believed to be because of Calendario's execution.

== Conspiracy and execution ==
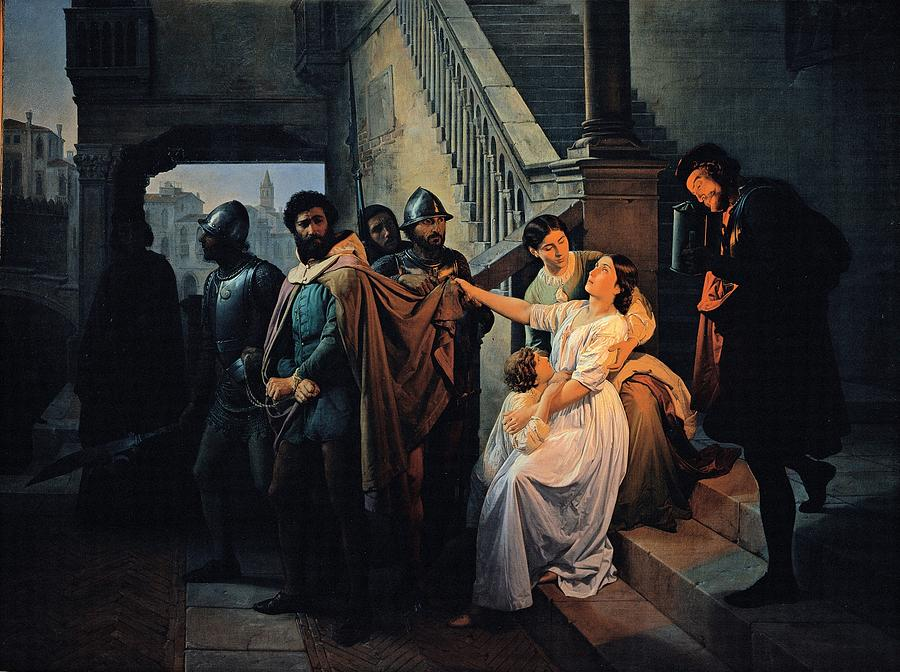
The Arrest of Filippo Calendario, by Pompeo Marino Molmenti

The new Doge of Venice, Marino Faliero (elected 1354), had ambitions to become Lord of Venice. However, the plot was uncovered and the conspirators arrested. Calendario was one of those found guilty of treason and, with the leader of the conspiracy Bertuccio Israello, sentenced to be hanged on 16 April 1355. They were both hanged from the balcony of the new Palace, reportedly with gags in their mouths. Calendario's son was also amongst the guilty men and later he was also hanged from the building.

== See also ==
- History of the Doge's Palace in Venice
