= Michele Giambono =

Italian painter (c.1400–c.1462)

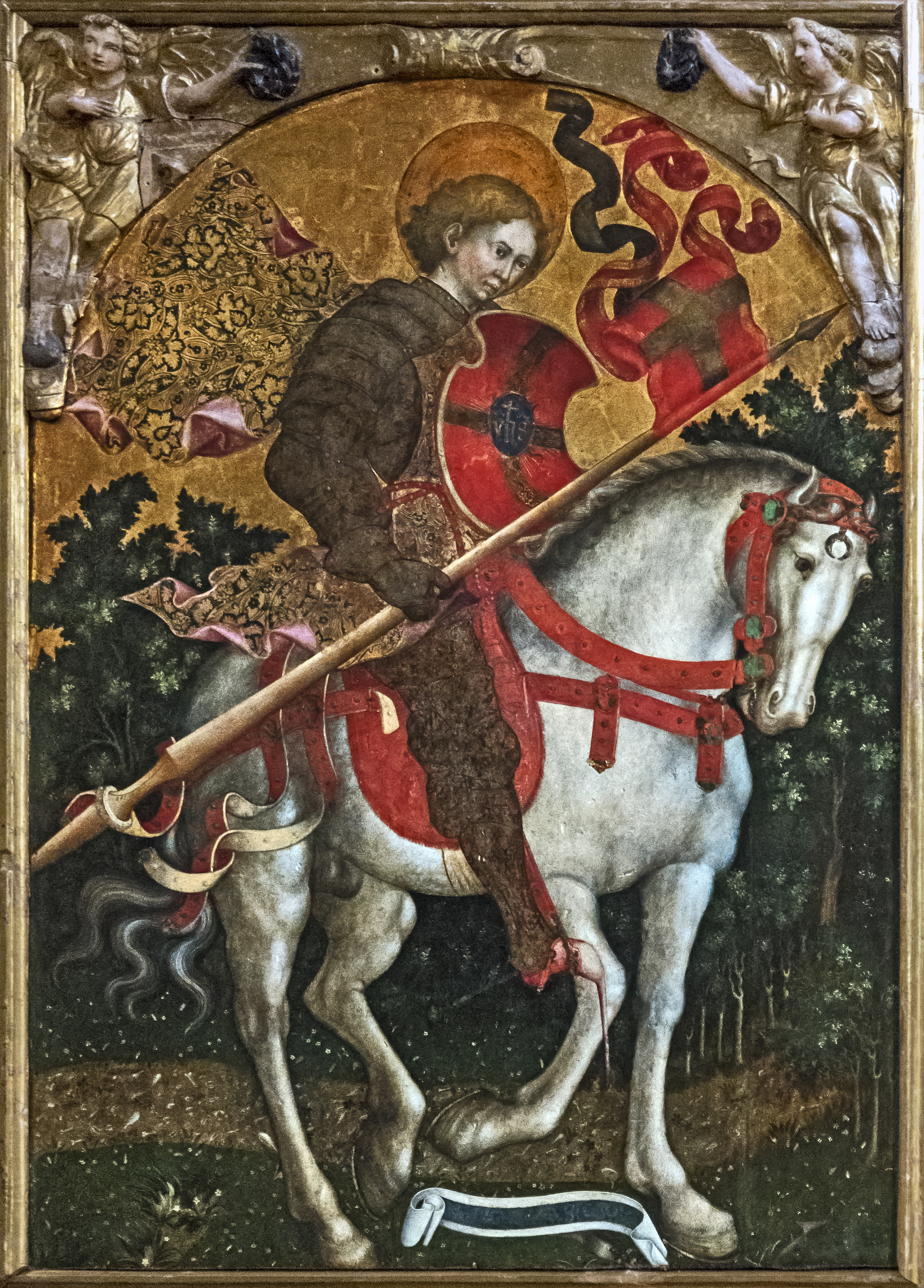
Michele Giambono, St. Chrysogonus on Horseback, c. 1450, Panel 199 x 134 cm, San Trovaso, Venice

Michele Taddeo di Giovanni Bono, known as Giambono (Note: Also known as Michele di Taddeo, Giambono, Zambone, Zambono, Bono, or Michele Giovanni Boni) (c. 1400 Venice – c. 1462 Venice) was an Italian painter, whose work reflected the International Gothic style with a Venetian influence. He designed the mosaics of the Birth of the Virgin and Presentation in the Temple (St. Mark's, Venice). His best known paintings are the Man of Sorrows (Metropolitan Mus.) and the St. Peter (National Gall. of Art, Washington, D.C.).

== Biography ==
=== Early life ===
Michele Taddeo di Giovanni Bono, known as Giambono was born in Venice c. 1400. His grandfather (Note: Giambono’s grandfather was a painter of Treviso called Giam Bono (also Zambono)) and father were painters. If the identification with Zanino di Pietro is accepted, then he was in Bologna in 1389-1404 and returned to Venice in c. 1407

=== Personal life ===
He was married in 1420. There is no known portrait of Giambono and little is known of his personal life.

=== Early career ===
He was an artist of the International Gothic style of art prevalent in Europe during the last half of the 14th century and the early years of the 15th century and decorated frames and wood in gold and polychromy. Originally known for his mosaic designs located in the Mascoli Chapel, San Marco, Venice, he is also now recognized as an accomplished panel painter.

=== Death ===
Giambono died in Venice in 1462.

== Art ==
=== Style ===
The International Gothic style is characterized by elegant and graceful figures with noble men and women wearing elaborate jewelry and richly embroidered clothes, featuring masses of curled hair and highly complex head pieces. “Landscapes and architectural settings were miniaturize; however, details of nature- leaves, flowers, insects, birds- are rendered with near microscopic detail". Artwork of the period is typified by the use of light, bright colors especially gold used in “manuscripts and panel paintings, tapestries and polychromed sculpture”.

=== Art influences ===
Giambono was active as an artist between 1420 and 1462 and was a follower of Jacobello del Fiore (c. 1385 – c. 1439), Gentile da Fabriano (c. 1360- c 1450) Pisanello.

== Selected works ==
=== Mosaics ===
Birth of the Virgin (1431–1433) Mascoli Chapel, San Marco, Venice

On the left vault in the Mascoli Chapel are two mosaics depicting the life of the Virgin, the Birth and the Presentation. The Birth panel shows “fanciful architecture, obliquely placed” similar to the backgrounds found in art work by Gentile da Fabriano. A group of people stand at the front of the building and surround the infant child. The mosaic has elaborate decorative elements that give the appearance of "complexity and detailed observation".

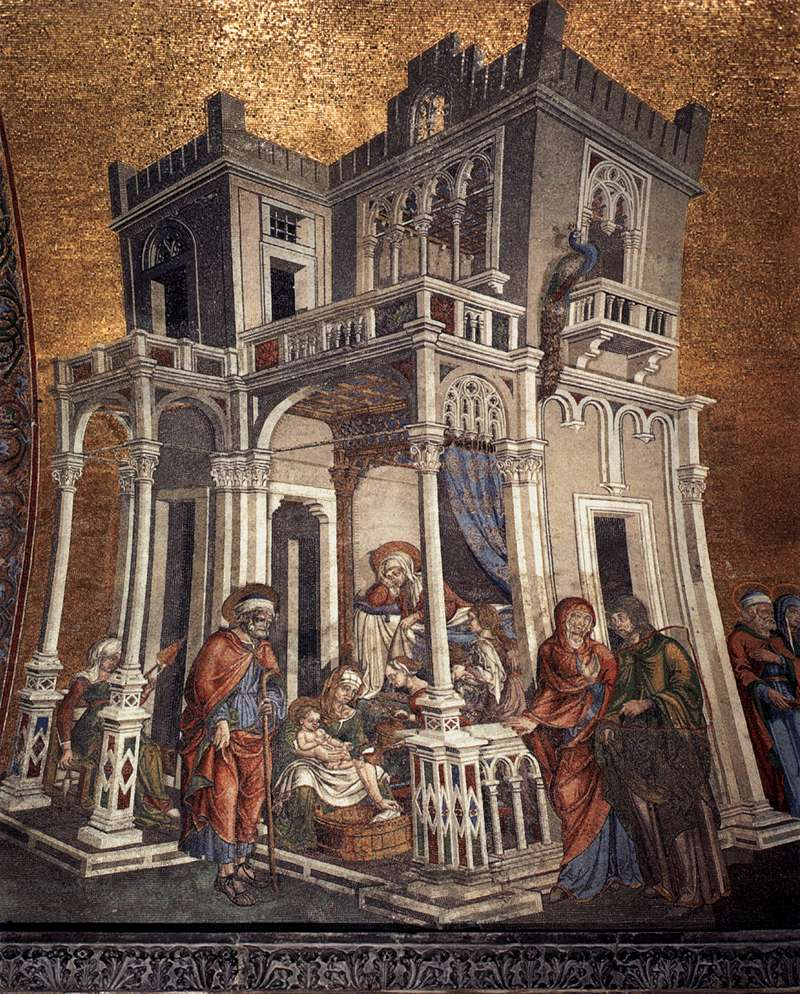
Birth of the Virgin (1431–1433) Mascoli Chapel, San Marco, Venice Movement: Renaissance (Early Italian, “quattrocentro”) Theme: Saints

The Visitation (c. 1451) Mascoli Chapel, San Marco, Venice

On the opposite side of the vault in Mascoli Chapel the life cycle of the Virgin is continued with the Visitation and Dornition of the Virgin. The style of these two panels differs from that used in the Birth and Presentation. As seen in the Visitation the building has several classical triangular shaped construction elements above horizontal structures with rounded arches and Corinthian capitals associated with the Florentine Renaissance style. The facades are centrally placed and symmetrical and the three-dimensional structure is realistic.

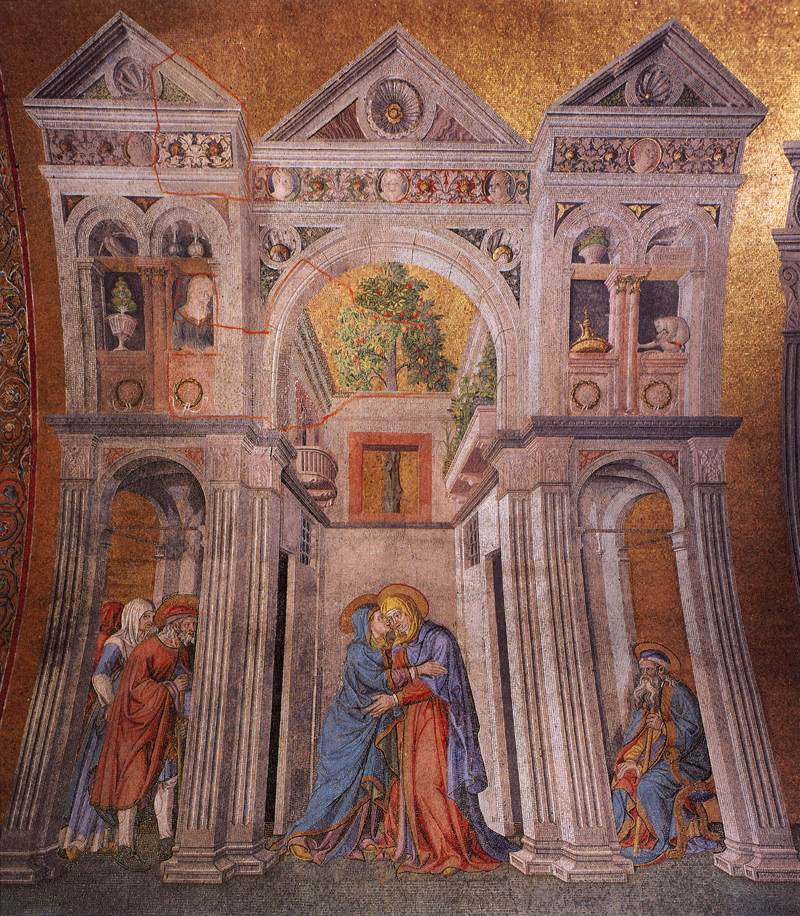
The Visitation (c. 1451) Mascoli Chapel, San Marco, Venice Movement: Renaissance (Early Italian, “quattrocentro”) Theme: Religious

=== Paintings ===
St. Chrysogonus on Horseback (c. 1450) San Trovaso, Venice

In a painting representative of the International Gothic style, a youthful St. Chrysogonus wears a suit of armor and a cloak embroidered with a raised black and gold pattern while mounted on a richly-caparisoned horse. The posture and color of the white horse is highlighted by the dark green trees that serve as a background in the lower half of the picture. Above the trees, the sky is represented by a gold ground that gives lightness to the painting. The emblems on the shield, flag and the presence of angels in the top corners of the painting generates a Christian theme with the Saint in a protective role. (Note: In his book Venetian Painting, John Steer notes that the depiction of the rider and horse in the St. Chrysogonus on Horseback painting is reminiscent of the work of Jacobello del Fiore and probably reflects the influence of this artist on Giambono's painting style.) The "tense pose of the Saint", suggested movement of the horse, and the flowing shape of the pennant and cloak provides an emotional force that is not seen in comparable paintings of this time period.

Virgin and Child (c. 1450) Galleria Franchetti, Ca' d'Oro, Venice

The figures are dressed in solid colors and are silhouetted against the brocaded textile in the background. The Virgin's angular facial features and serious expression contrast with the rounded features of the Christ-Child. The child is holding a goldfinch that represents a “premonition of the Passion". The richly decorated velvet background features pomegranates, a fruit closely “associated with blood, death and resurrection”. Textiles featuring pomegranate fruit in the pattern were widely adopted by Italians and are typically found in ecclesiastical and courtly depictions. Giambono was among the first Italian artists to use the iconographic meaning of these textiles in a Christian context.

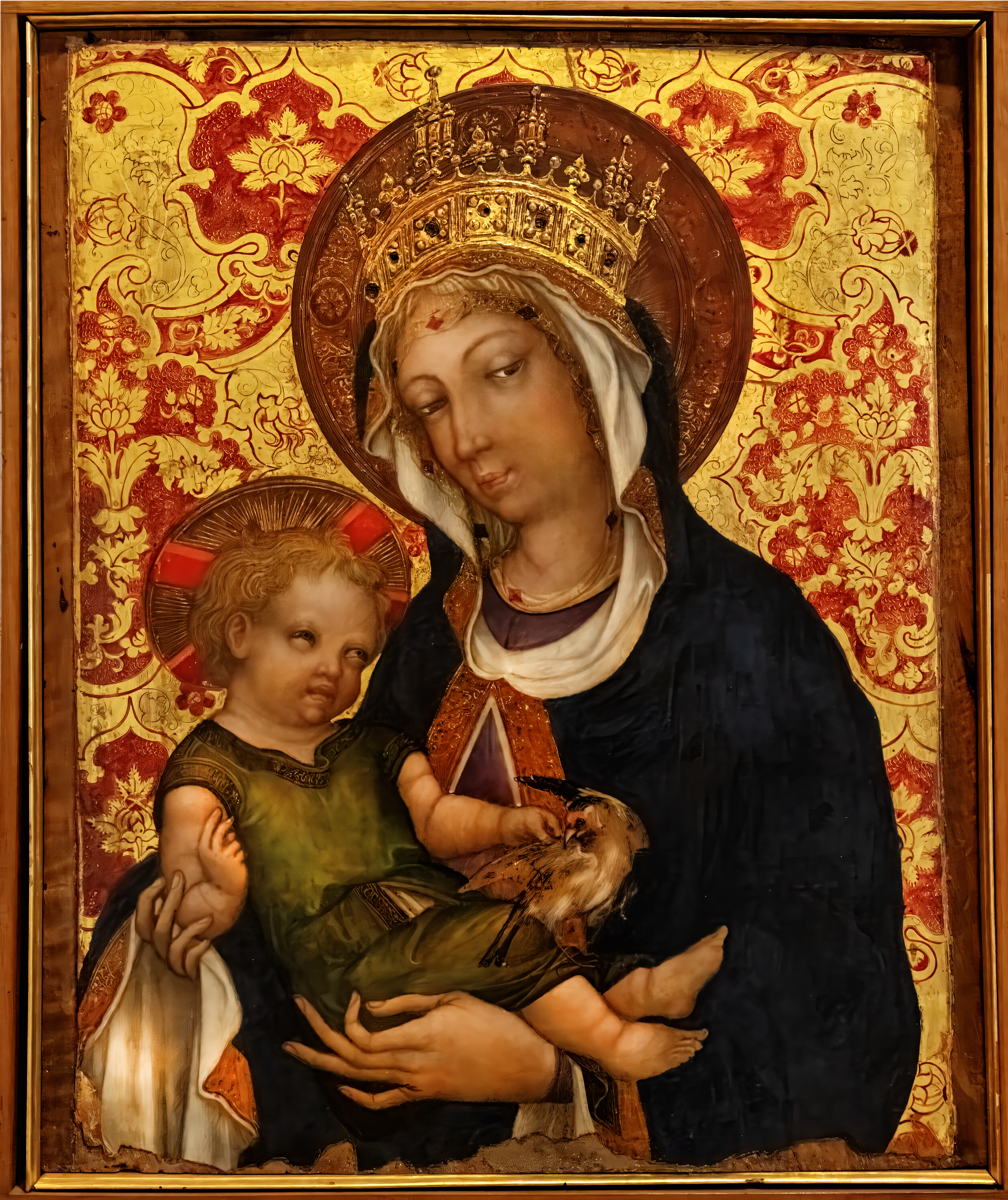
Virgin and Child (c. 1450) Museo Correr

Portrait of a Man (1432–1434) Palazzo Rosso, Genoa

Movement: Renaissance (Early Italian, “quattrocentro”), Theme: Portrait, Technique: Tempera and silver on wood, Size: 53 x 40 cm The painting is important as one of the very few surviving examples of a Venetian portrait from the early 15th century. The unknown subject is dressed in an ornately decorated velvet robe with the neck opening lined with fur. The man wears an oversized hat and a doublet with a high collar worn under the robe. The dress and facial features of the man suggest the subject is not Italian, but rather a northern European who was living in Venice. The portrait has also been attributed to Gentile de Fabriano and Pisanello, but the generalized facial characteristics set “against a uniform bluish background are typical of Giambono's work".

Polyptych of St. James (c. 1450) Gallerie dell’Accademia, Venice

The polyptych has five panels each featuring a religious saint. St. James the Greater occupies the larger central panel with St John the Evangelist and St Filippo Benizzi situated to the left, is St Michael the Archangel and St Louis of Toulouse are to the right of the central panel. The highly detailed figures provide a “slow semicircular rhythm” to the polyptych. Each figure is painted in bold solid colors contrasting against a gold ground. The depiction of the Archangel Michael in his heavy armor decorated with gold, his pale face and mass of curls, particularly reflects the strong influence of Pisanello.

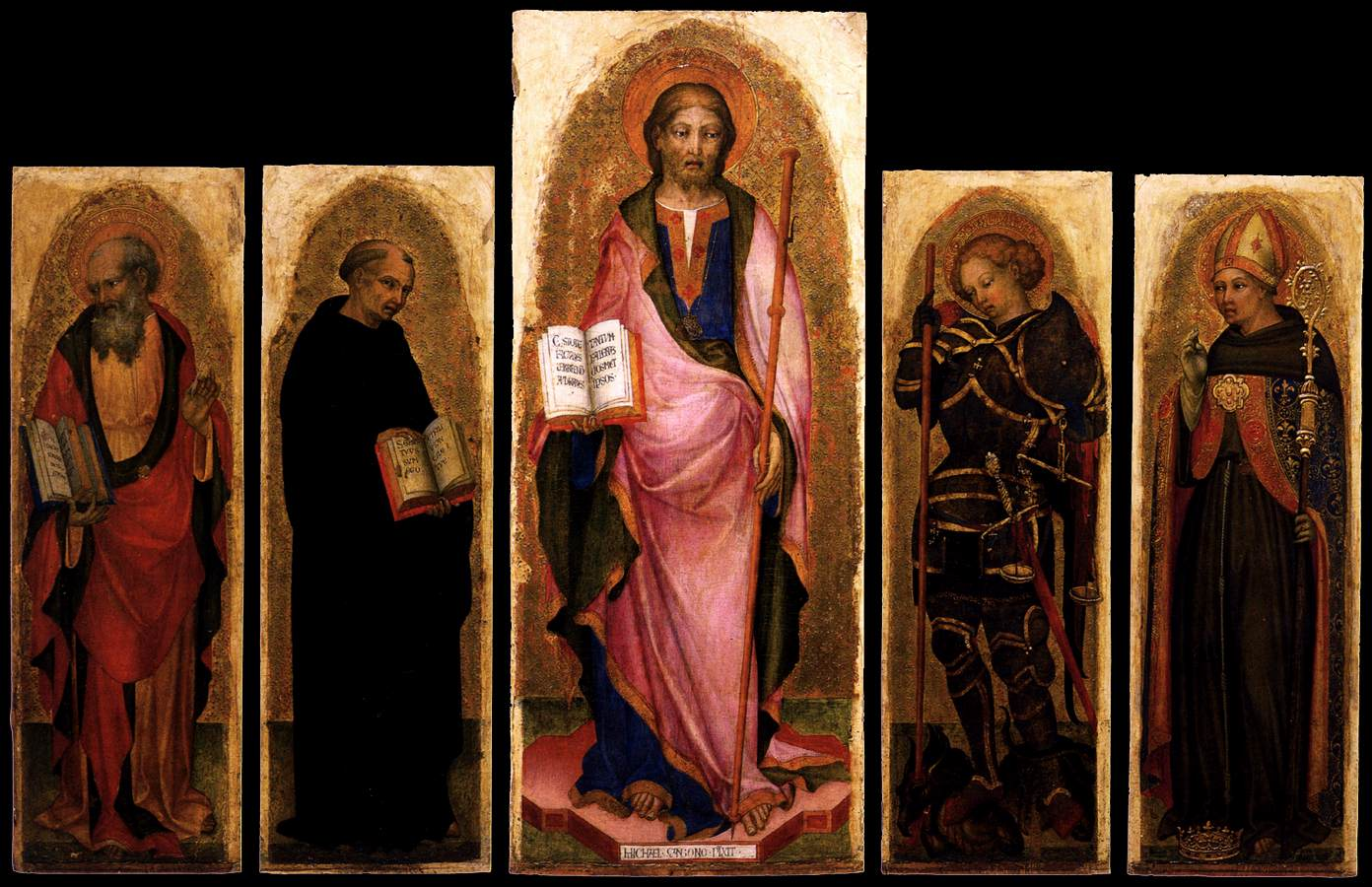
Michele Giambono - Polyptych of St James (c. 1450) Gallerie dell’Accademia, Venice. Tempera on panel, 109 x 44 cm -central panel, 88 x 29 cm –side panels

The Man of Sorrows (ca. 1420–1430) Metropolitan Museum, New York Movement: Renaissance (Early Italian, “quattrocentro”) Theme: New Testament Technique: Tempera and gold on wood Size: 47 x 31.1 cm

The Man of Sorrows depicts the small figure of Saint Francis at the left side of the picture expressing his grief over Christ's Crucifixion. Christ is positioned in an open tomb with a gash on the right side of his abdomen caused by a lance and wounds to his hands resulting from crucifixion. “Although Christ is unquestionably dead, there is still energy in his partly lowered head and extended arms. Streams of blood, sculpted in thick gesso, gush from wounds carved into the panel”. St. Francis is receiving the stigmata that come from the wounds of Christ.

Coronation of the Virgin (c. 1448) Gallerie dell’Accademia, Venice

Coronation of the Virgin, also known as Paradise, was “commissioned from Giambono in 1447 by Giovanni Dotto”. The work was originally destined for the Church of S. Agnese but is currently located in the Gallerie dell’ Accademia, Venice. Giovani Dotto stipulated that the painting be similar to the one previously painted by Antonio Vivarini and Giovanni d'Alemagna for the church of San Pantalon, Venice.

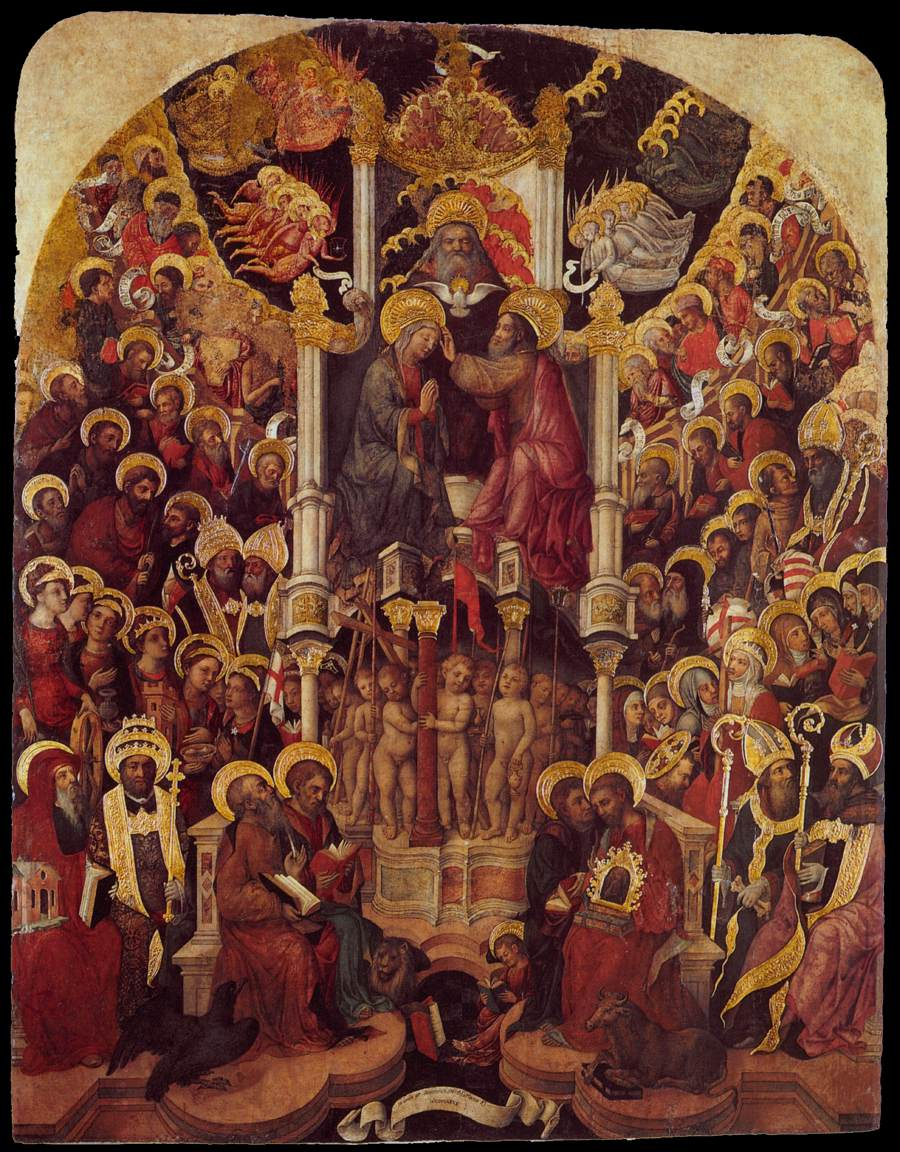
Coronation of the Virgin (c. 1448) Gallerie dell’Accademia, Venice Movement: Renaissance (Early Italian, “quattrocentro”) Theme: New Testament Technique: Tempera on panel Size: 229 x 176 cm
