= Vivarini =

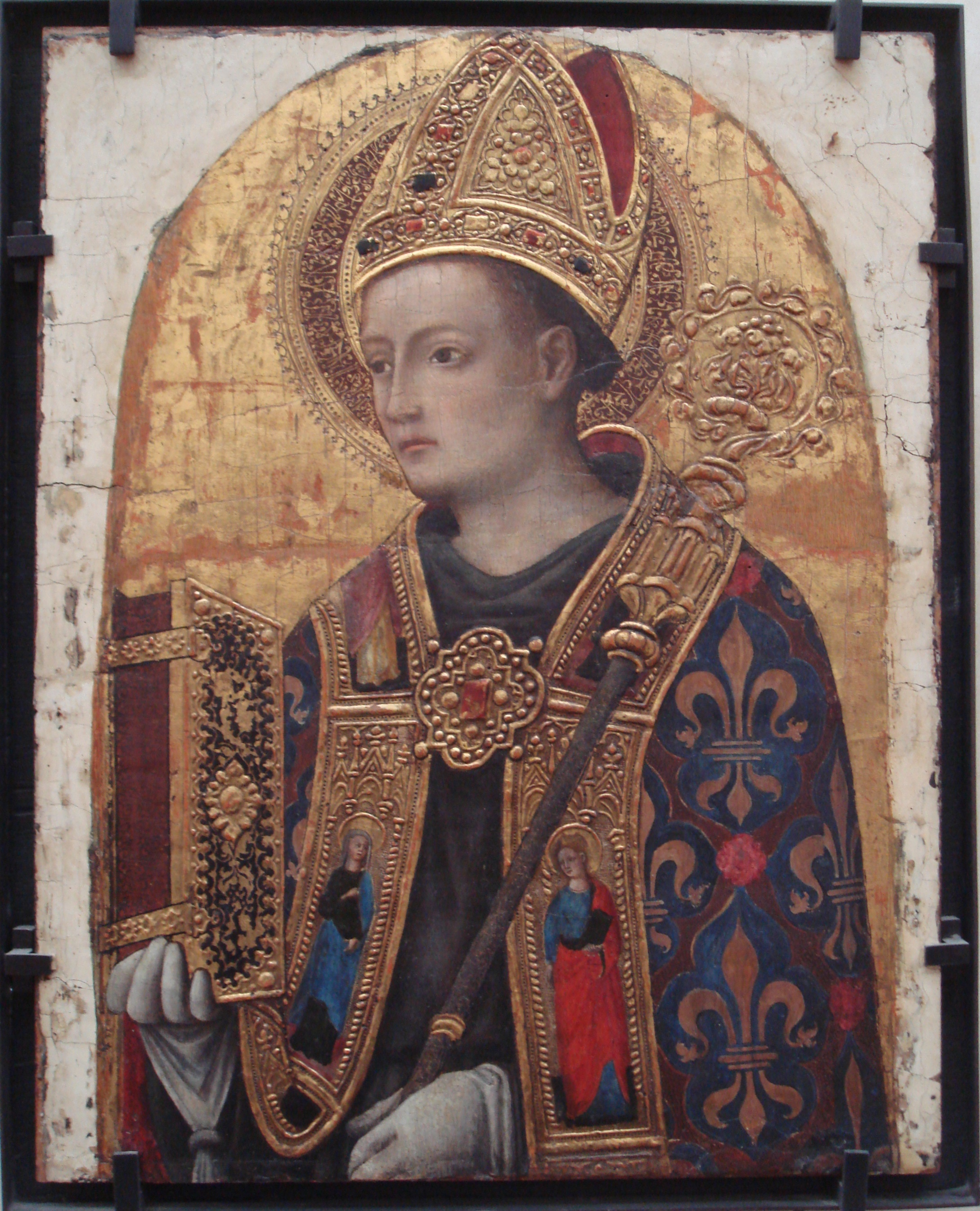
Antonio Vivarini, Saint Louis de Toulouse, 1450

Vivarini is the surname of a family of painters from Murano (Venice), who produced a great quantity of work in Venice and its neighborhood in the 15th century, leading on to that phase of the school which is represented by Carpaccio and the Bellini family.

- Antonio Vivarini (Antonio of Murano) was probably the earliest of this family. He came from the school of Andrea da Murano, and his works show the influence of Gentile da Fabriano. The earliest known date of a picture of his, an altarpiece in the Venetian academy, is 1440; the latest, in the Lateran museum, 1464, but he appears to have been alive in 1470. He worked in company with a certain "Joannes de Alemania", who has been (with considerable doubt) regarded as a brother (Giovanni of Murano), but no trace of this painter exists of a date later than 1447. After 1447 Antonio painted either alone or in combination with his younger brother Bartolomeo. The works of Antonio are well drawn for their epoch, with a certain noticeable degree of softness, and with good flesh and other tints. Three of his principal paintings are the Virgin Enthroned with the Four Doctors of the Church, the Coronation of the Virgin and SS Peter and Jerome. The first two (in which Giovanni cooperated) are in the Venetian Accademia, the third in the National Gallery, London. This gallery contains also specimens of the two following painters.
- Bartolomeo Vivarini is known to have worked from 1450 to 1499. He learned oil painting from Antonello da Messina, and is said to have produced, in 1473, the first oil picture done in Venice. This is in the church of San Giovanni e Paolo, a large altarpiece in nine divisions, representing Augustine and other saints. Most of his works, however, including one in the National Gallery, are in tempera. His outline is always hard, and his color good; the figures have much dignified and devout expression. As vivarino means in Italian a goldfinch, he sometimes drew a goldfinch as the signature of his pictures.
- Luigi or Alvise Vivarini, born c. 1446, painted from 1475 until his death in 1502. It has sometimes been supposed that, besides the Luigi who was the latest of this pictorial family, there had also been another Luigi who was the earliest, this supposition being founded on the fact that one picture is signed with the name, with the date 1414. There is good ground, however, for considering this date to be a forgery of a later time. The works of Luigi show an advance on those of his predecessors, and some of them are productions of high attainment; one of the best was executed for the Scuola di San Girolamo in Venice, representing the saint caressing his lion, and some monks decamping in terror. Other works by him are in Treviso and in Milan. He painted some remarkable portraits. Marco Basaiti was one of his pupils.
