= Palazzo Roverella, Rovigo =

Coordinates: 45°04′14″N 11°47′24″E

The Palazzo Roverella is a Renaissance-style palace located in via Laurenti 8/10, Rovigo, region of Veneto, Italy.

== History and description ==
The palace now serves as the town art and archeology gallery and host for exhibitions. The archeology collection includes artifacts and items from Egypt, Greece, Etruria, and Rome. The collection includes:

- St Lucy and Scenes from her life by Quirizio da Murano
- Christ carrying Cross by Giovanni Bellini
- Madonna and Child by Pasqualino Veneto
- Madonna and Child between St Jerome and St Helena (1520s) by Palma Vecchio
- St Cajetan of Thiene by Giovanni Battista Piazzetta
- Portrait of a young man by Andrea Previtali
- Portrait of Antonio Riccobono by Giovanni Battista Tiepolo
- Portrait of Cardinal Bartolomeo Roverella by Giovanni Battista Pittoni
- Portrait of Giulio Contarini da Mula (1759) by Alessandro Longhi
- Portrait of Giovanni Tommaso Minadois by Giuseppe Nogari
- Portrait of Doge Alvise Pisani by Bartolomeo Nazzari
- Portrait of Conte Gasparo Campo by Giovanni Battista Piazzetta
- Sacred Conversation by Girolamo da Santacroce
- Madonna and Child by Nicolo Rondinelli
- The circumcision by Marco Bello
