= San Pantalon =

Church in Venice, Italy

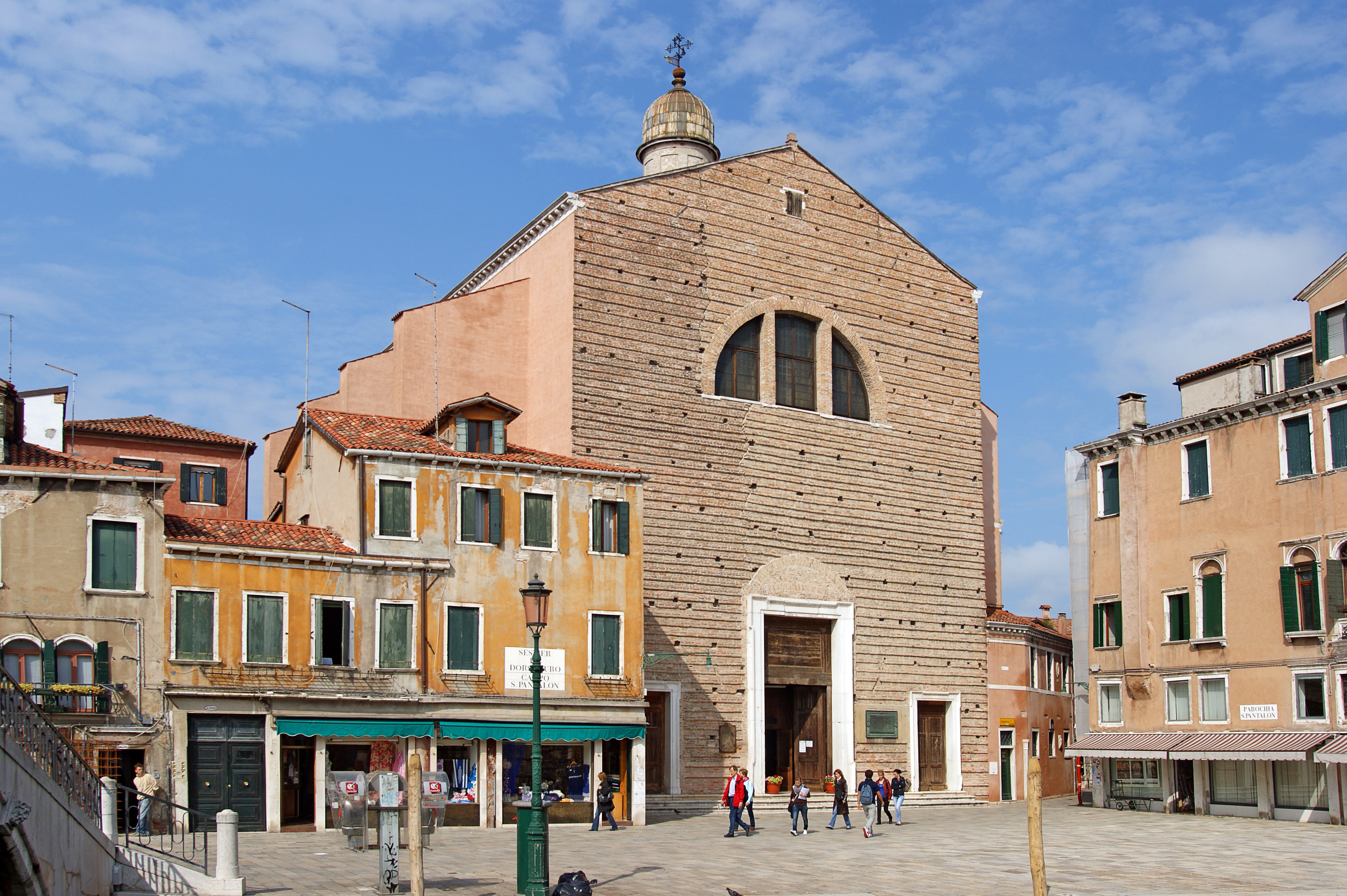

- Location within Venice Location within Italy

Religion
- Affiliation: Roman Catholic
- Province: Venice

Location
- Location: Venice, Italy
- Interactive map of San Pantalon
- Coordinates: 45.4356°N 12.3242°E

The Chiesa di San Pantaleone Martire, known as San Pantalon in the Venetian language, is a church in the Dorsoduro sestiere of Venice, Italy. It is located on the Campo San Pantalon (square), and is dedicated to Saint Pantaleon.

The 17th-century Chiesa di San Pantalon is a parish church of the Vicariate of San Polo-Santa Croce-Dorsoduro.

== Architectural elements ==
San Pantalon is particularly well known for its immense ceiling painting, depicting The Martyrdom and Apotheosis of St Pantalon. It was painted on canvas by Gian Antonio Fumiani between 1680 and 1704, when he fell to his death from the scaffolding, although some sources date his death to six years after he stopped work on the San Pantalon ceiling.

Other notable works include Coronation of the Virgin by Antonio Vivarini and Giovanni d'Alemagna in the Chapel of the Holy Nail and St Pantalon healing a Boy, the last work by Veronese, originally commissioned for the high altar.

=== Assessments of the Fumiani fresco ===
Modern critics note that the dramatic sotto in su canvas marks the entry of Bolognese quadratura to Venice; Fumiani had studied with the perspective painter Domenico degli Ambrogi.

John Ruskin, in his typical disdain of all post-Quattrocento works, described the ceiling oil painting as a:

sorrowful lesson...All the mischief that Paul Veronese did may be seen in the halting and hollow magnificences of them;—all the absurdities, either of painting or piety, under afflatus of vile ambition. Roof puffed up and broken through, as it were, with breath of the fiend from below, instead of pierced by heaven's light from above; the rags and ruins of Venetian skill, honour, and worship, exploded all together sky-high. Miracles of frantic mistake, of flaunting and thunderous hypocrisy,—universal lie, shouted through speaking-trumpets...(It is) the most curious example in Europe of the vulgar dramatic effects of painting.

John Crowley's novel The Solitudes, his first volume in the Ægypt series, has an extended response to the painting.

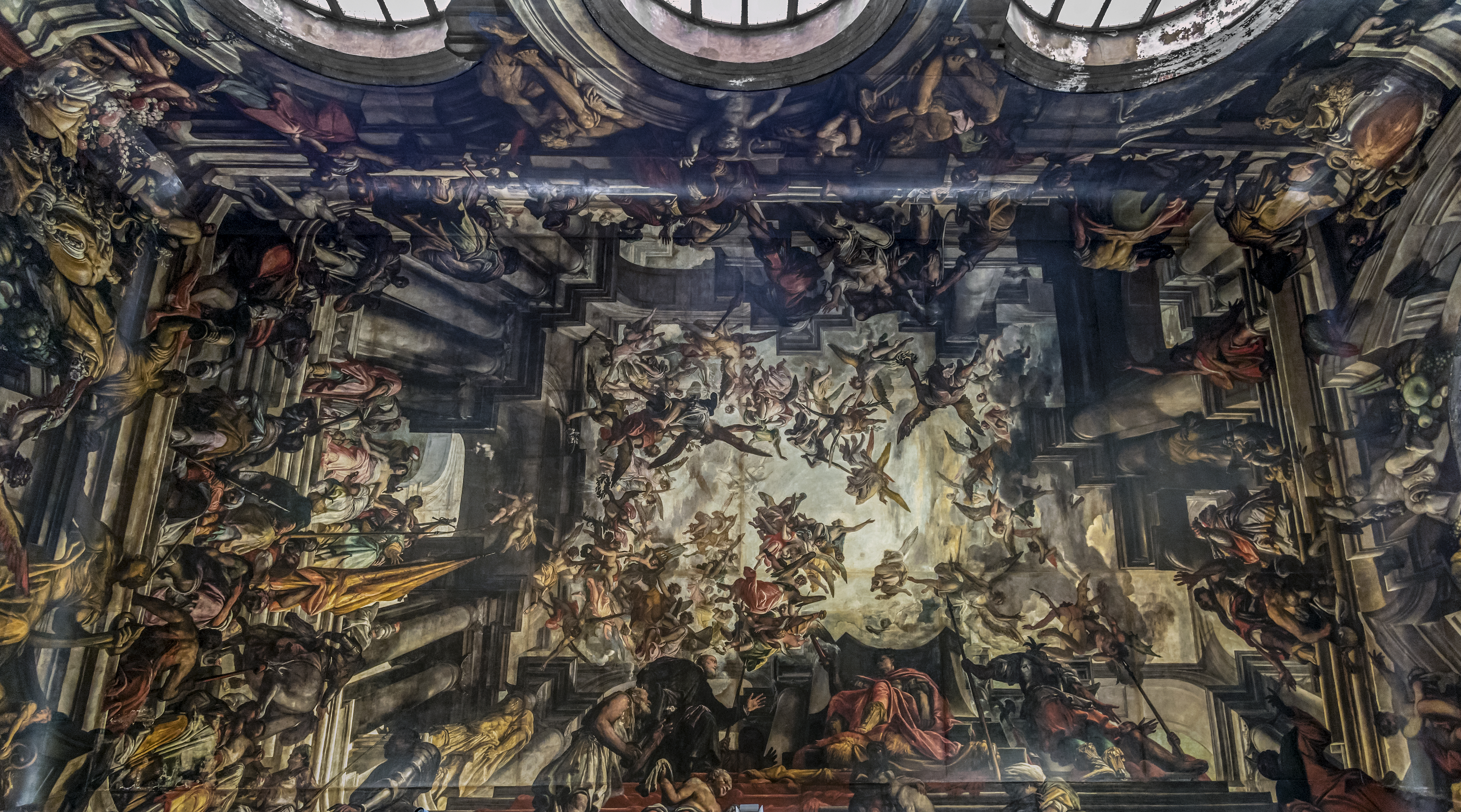
The Martyrdom and Apotheosis of St Pantalon

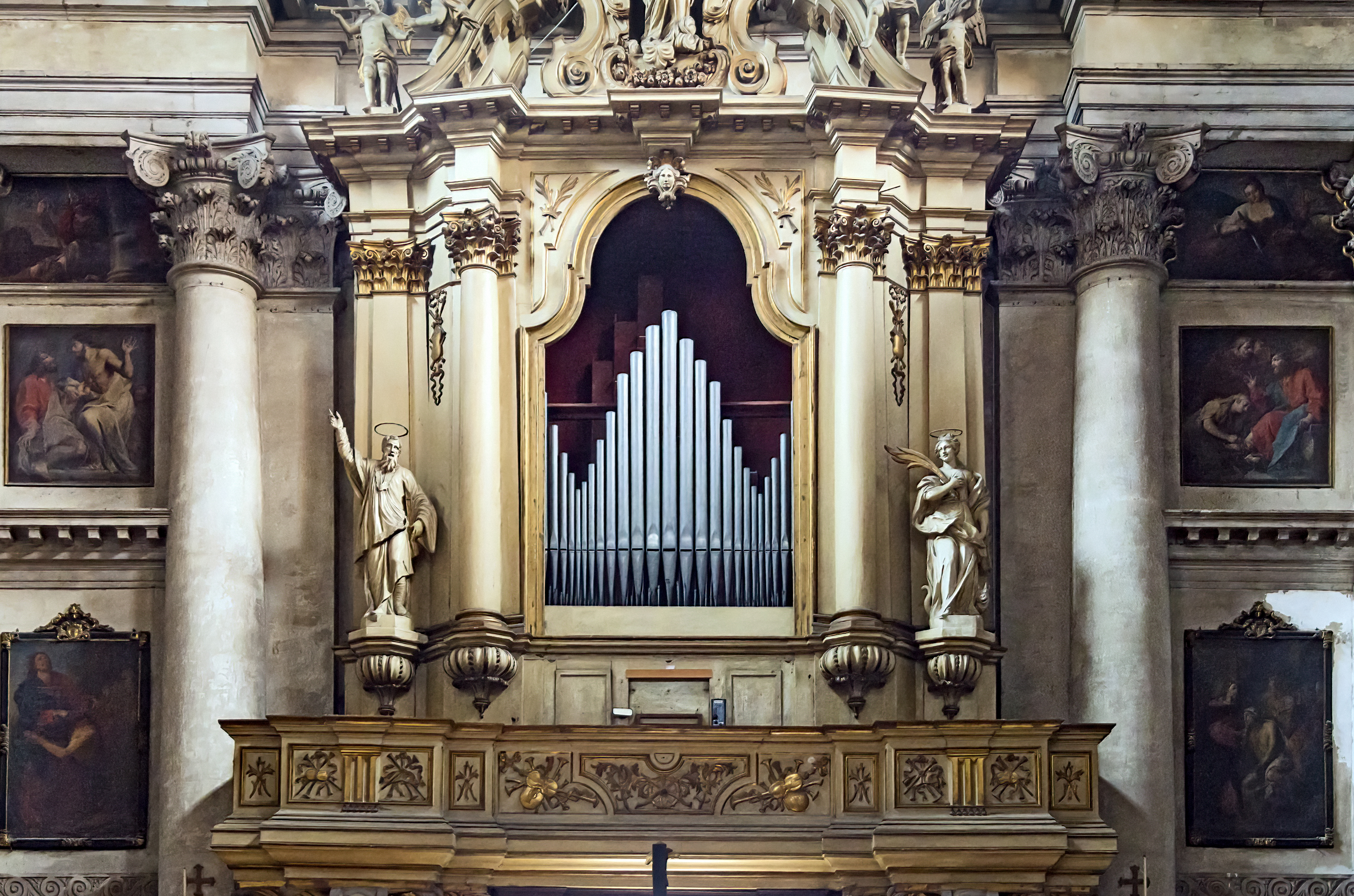
Organ Op. 400 by Gaetano Callido

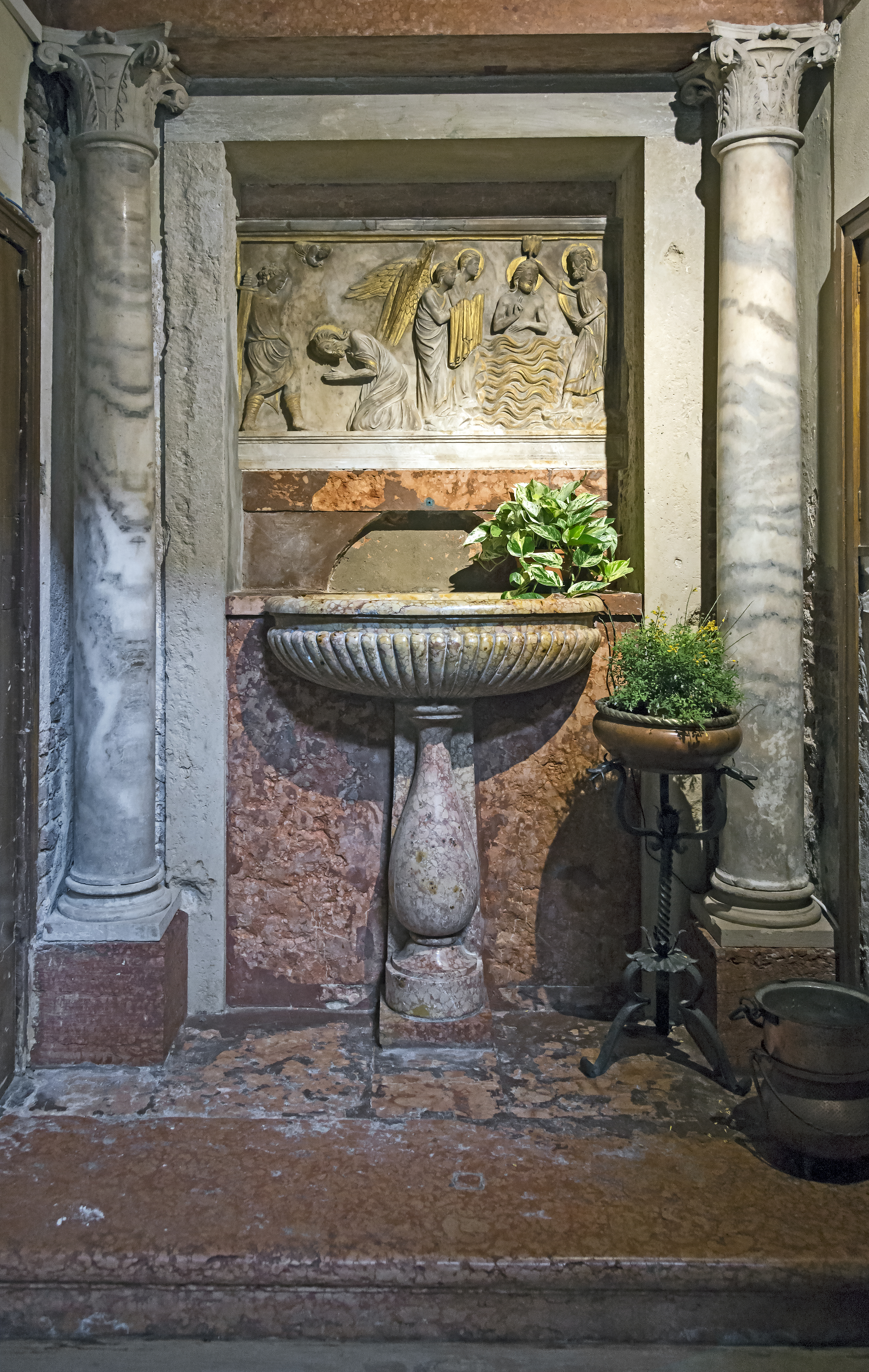
Baptismal font

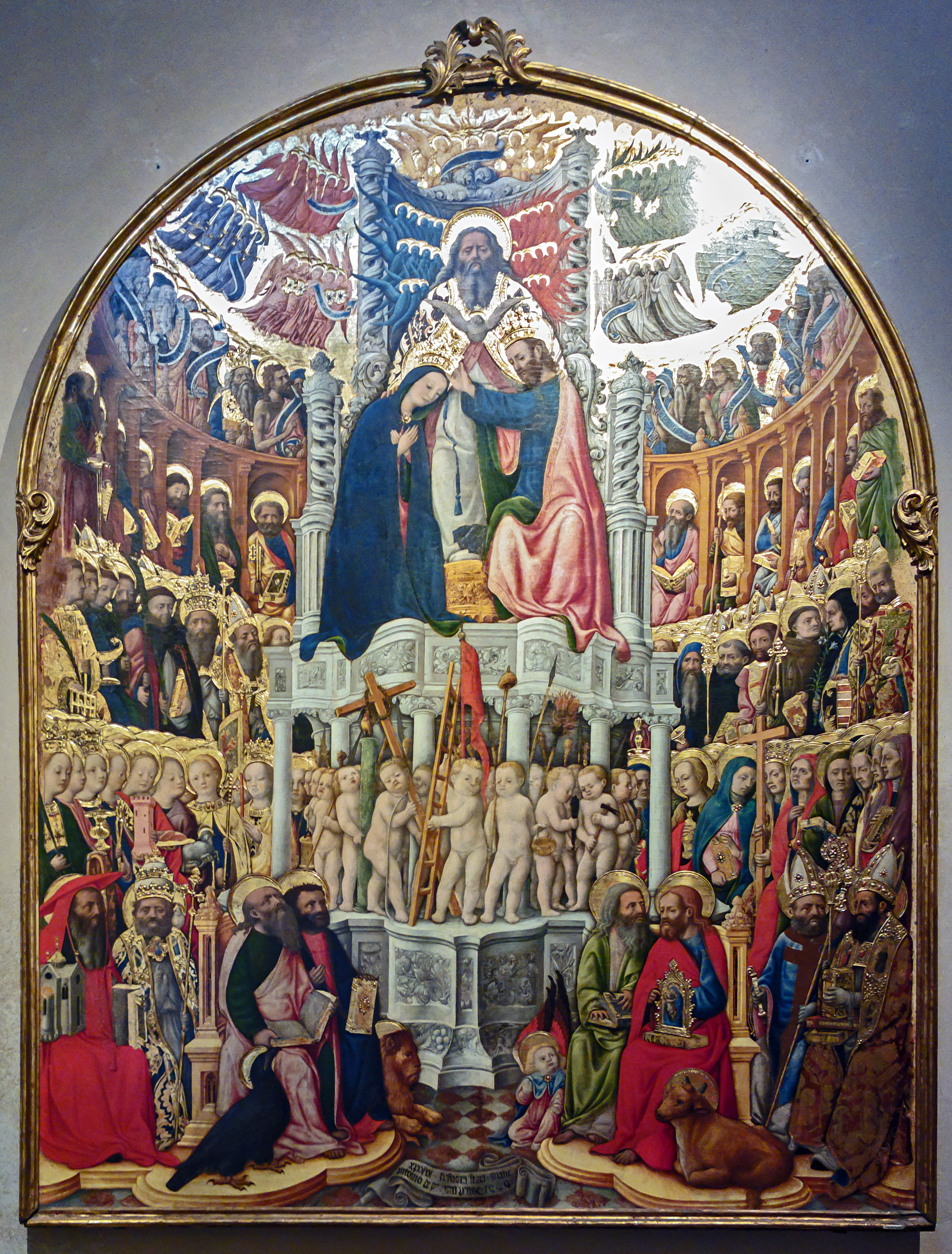
Coronation of the Virgin, 1444 by Antonio Vivarini and Giovanni d'Alemagna
