= Giovanni Antonio Fumiani =

Italian painter (1645–1710)

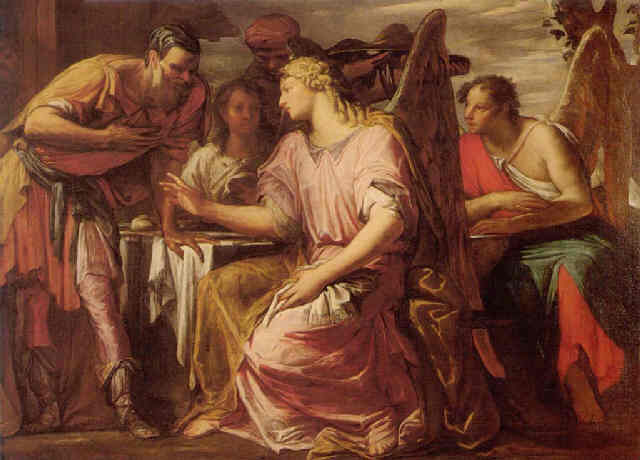
Abraham and the Three Angels, oil on canvas, 129 x 183 cm. Private collection.

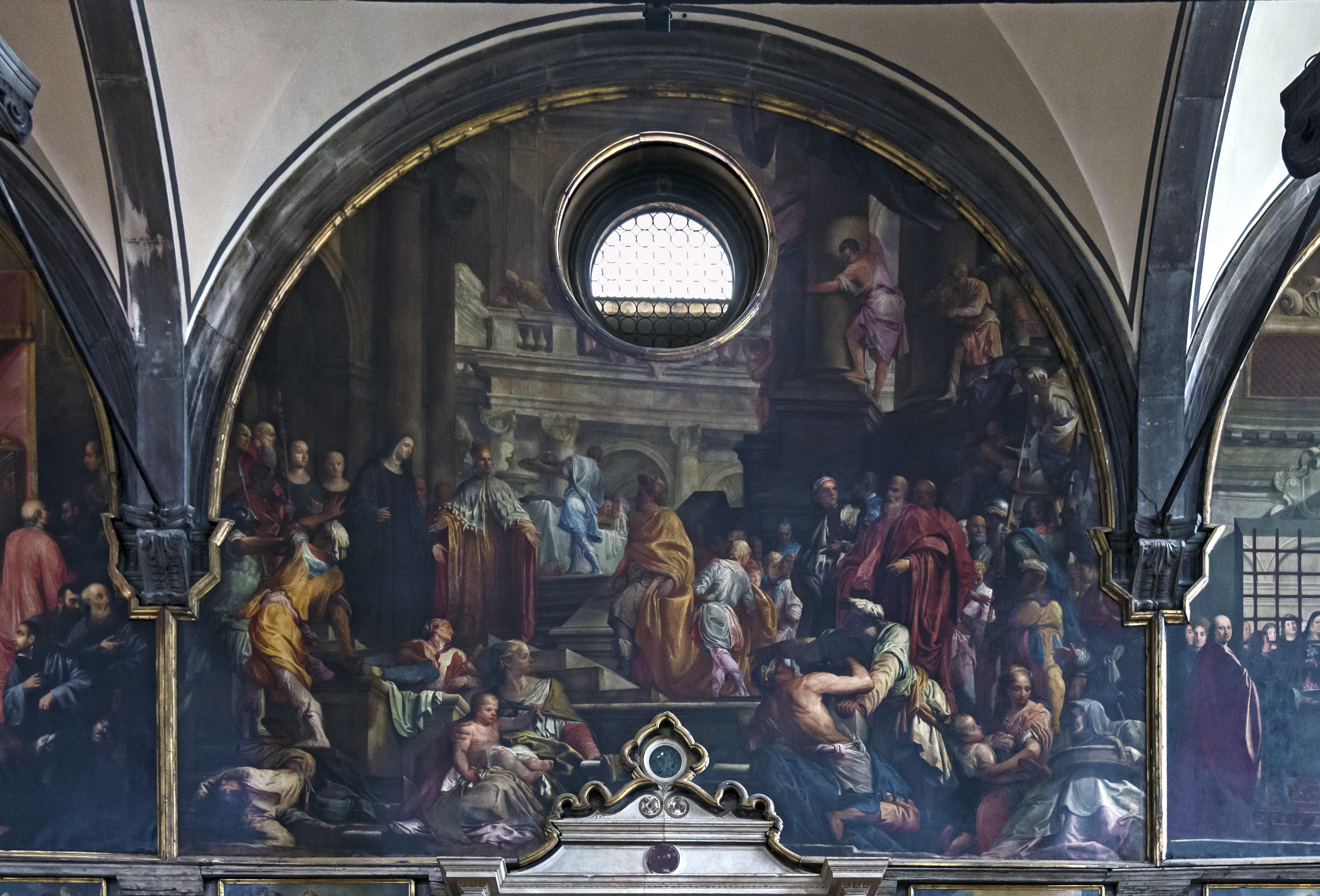
Otto III (or Frederick III) Visiting the Convent of San Zaccaria in the Company of the Doge. Venice, San Zaccaria.

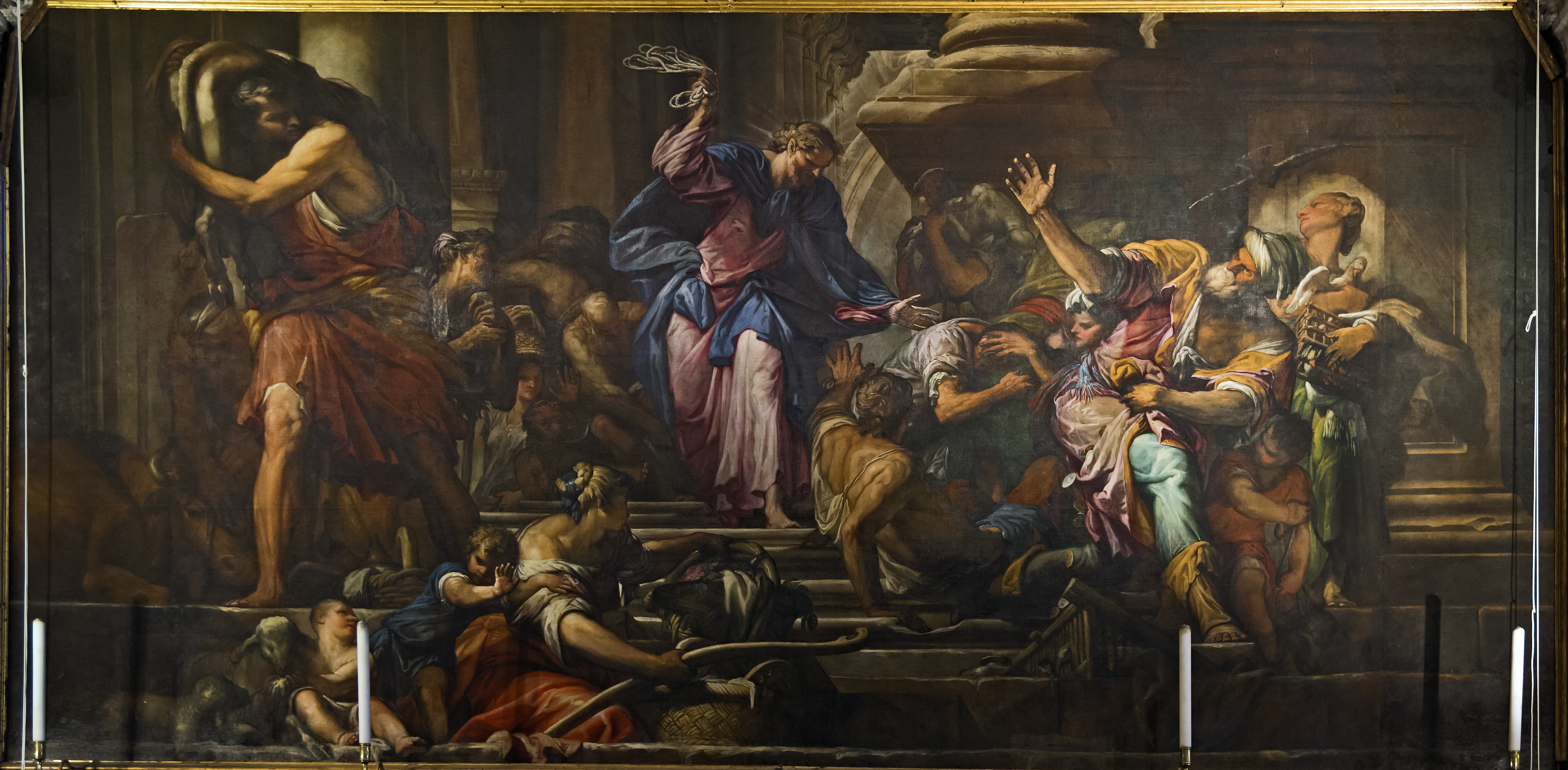
Christ driving the moneychangers from the temple, San Rocco

Giovanni Antonio Fumiani (1645–1710) was an Italian painter of the Baroque period.

== Biography ==
Born in Venice in 1645, he trained in Bologna under Domenico degli Ambrogi, a specialist in quadratura, but by 1668 he was back in Venice, where he painted a Virgin and Saints in San Benedetto. He was influenced by Ludovico Carracci and Alessandro Tiarini, and soon also became interested in the work of Paolo Veronese, so that he started to use elaborate architectural settings and brighter colours. He painted a Virgin Appearing to Pius V (1674; Vicenza, S Lorenzo), whose monumentality foreshadows Tiepolo, whereas mosaics in San Marco, created in 1677 from Fumiani’s cartoons, are closer to the idiosyncratic art of Pietro della Vecchia. He contributed to the decoration of San Rocco (1675, 1676, 1678), where he painted a large canvas of the Charity of St Roch on the ceiling of the nave. In his smaller paintings, however, such as the modelli (Florence, Uffizi) painted for the patron Ferdinand de Medici, Grand Prince of Tuscany, for whom he worked for a long time, with Niccolò Cassana acting as intermediary, Fumiani revealed a lively decorative sense and a taste for animated, sensual subjects that produced works of great quality.

== Works ==
Between 1684 and 1704, Fumiani decorated the ceiling of San Pantalon in Venice (Chiesa di San Pantaleone Martire) with a painting on canvas, which is the second largest in the world after the one in Maddaloni's school "Convitto Nazionale Giordano Bruno". The painting depicts The Martyrdom and Apotheosis of San Pantalon across 44 canvases that cover the large ceiling (25x50 m). This was an ambitious undertaking, both in its scale and in the unity of the magniloquent images, that parallels Andrea Pozzo’s decoration at the church of Sant'Ignazio in Rome.

Fumiani putatively died from a fall from a San Pantalon ceiling scaffold, although some sources date his death to six years after he stopped work on the San Pantalon ceiling.

One of his last works was the 1705 large lunette depicting Otto III (or Frederick III) Visiting the Convent of San Zaccaria in the Company of the Doge (Venice, San Zaccaria).

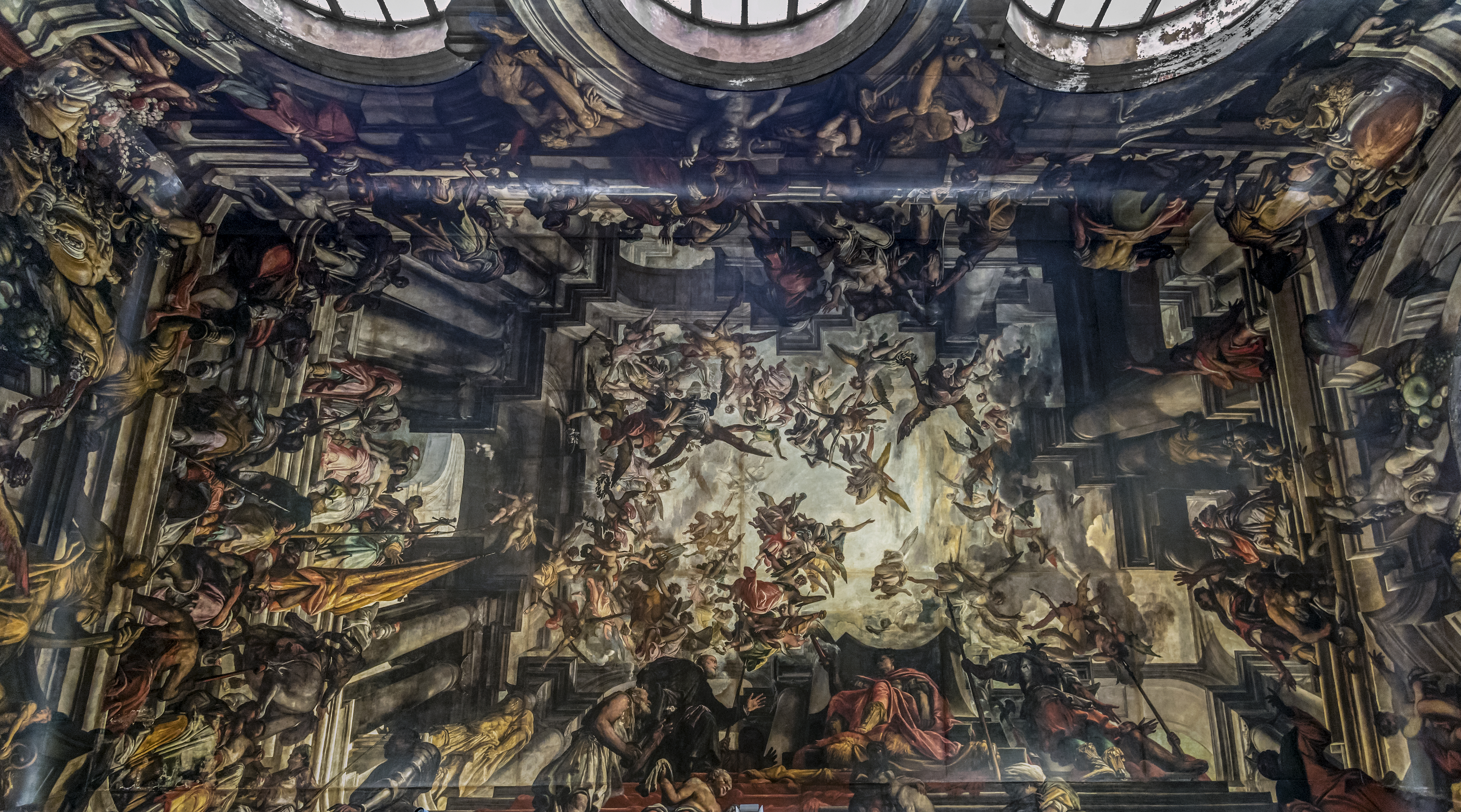
Ceiling at San Pantalon.

== Sources ==
- San Pantalon restoration
