= Alvise Vivarini =

Italian painter

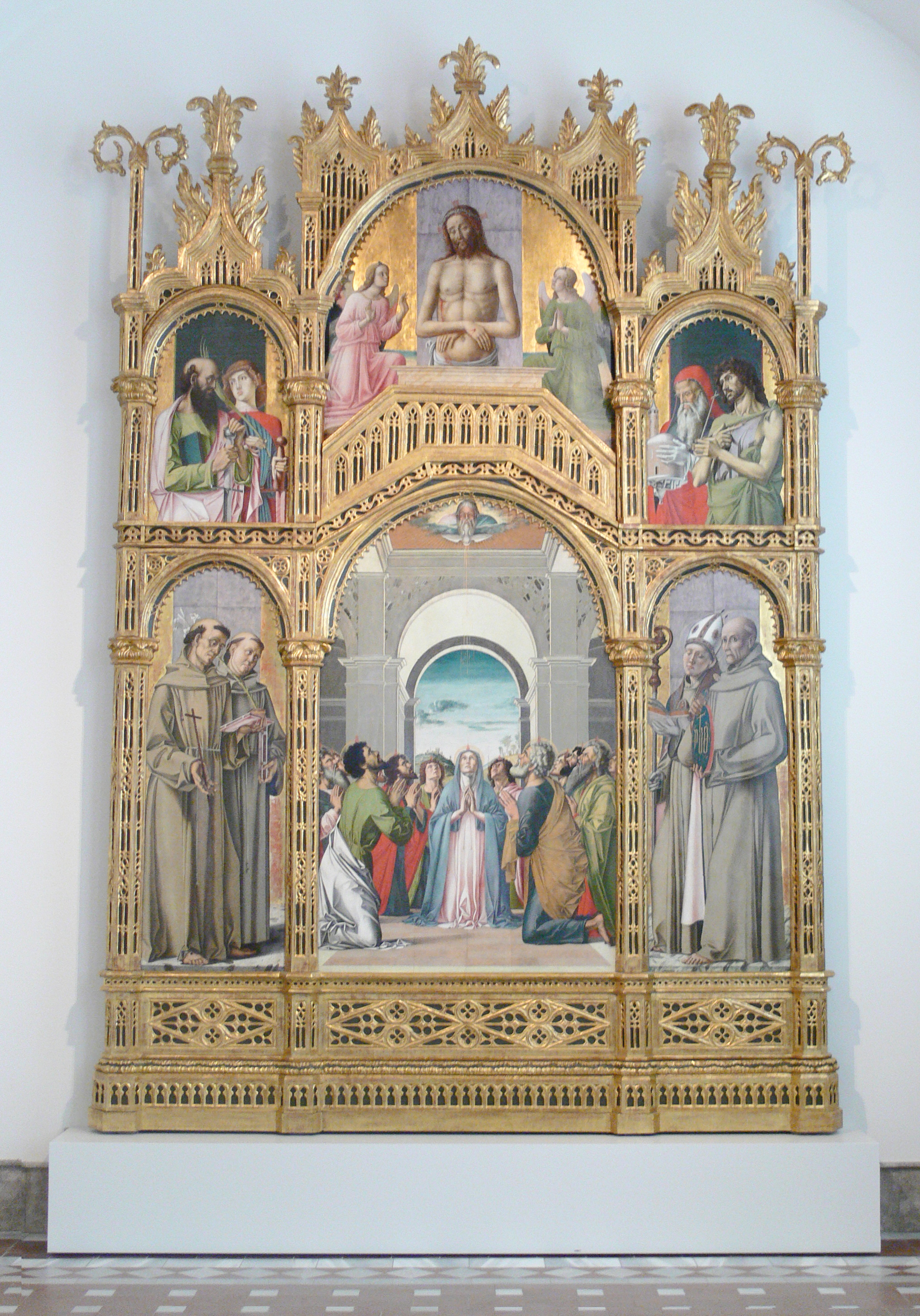
Alvise Vivarini: Retable of the Pentecost (Bode-Museum, Berlin)

Alvise or Luigi Vivarini (1442/1453–1503/1505) was an Italian painter, the leading Venetian artist before Giovanni Bellini. Like Bellini, he was part of a dynasty of painters. His father was Antonio Vivarini and his uncle, with whom he may have trained, was Bartolomeo Vivarini. Another uncle, on his mother's side, was the artist known as Giovanni d'Alemagna, who worked with his brother-in-law Antonio. Alvise may have trained Jacopo de' Barbari.

It has sometimes been supposed that, besides the Luigi who was the latest of this pictorial family, there had also been another Luigi who was the earliest (i.e. Antonio's father), this supposition being founded on the fact that one picture is signed with the name, with the date 1414. There is good ground, however, for considering this date to be a forgery of a later time.

The works of Vivarini show an advance on those of his predecessors, and some of them are productions of high attainment; one of the best was executed for the Scuola di San Girolamo in Venice, representing the saint caressing his lion, and some monks decamping in terror. The architecture and perspective in this work are superior.

Many churches in Venice have examples. Other works by Vivarini are in Treviso, Milan and the National Gallery, London. He painted some remarkable portraits.

The Adoration of Christ dated 1476, in the sacristy of the church of Montefiorentino, is one of his early productions. In 1480 he painted a Virgin and Saints for San Francesco, Treviso, now in the Venice Accademia. To about this date belong the SS. Matthew and John the Baptist, in the same collection; and the fresco of Christ Carrying His Cross in Santi Giovanni e Paolo. In 1488, Alvise Vivarini wrote a letter to the Signory of Venice, requesting permission to share with Bellini in the commission to decorate the Hall of Great Council in the Doge's Palace. To this he received a favorable reply, and thereupon executed two paintings, which were burned in the fire of 1577. The subjects, Vasari tells us, were Otho promising to mediate between Venice and Barbarossa and Barbarossa receiving his Son. The Council were so pleased with the pictures that, in 1492, Alvise was named Depentor in Gran Conseio, with a salary of five ducats a month. Notwithstanding this work for the State, he continued to paint altar-pieces for private patrons. The Apotheosis of St. Ambrose (1503) in the Cappella Milimesi of the Frari, Venice, was probably the last production of Alvise, as the inscription tells us that it was completed after his death by Marco Basaiti, one of his pupils.

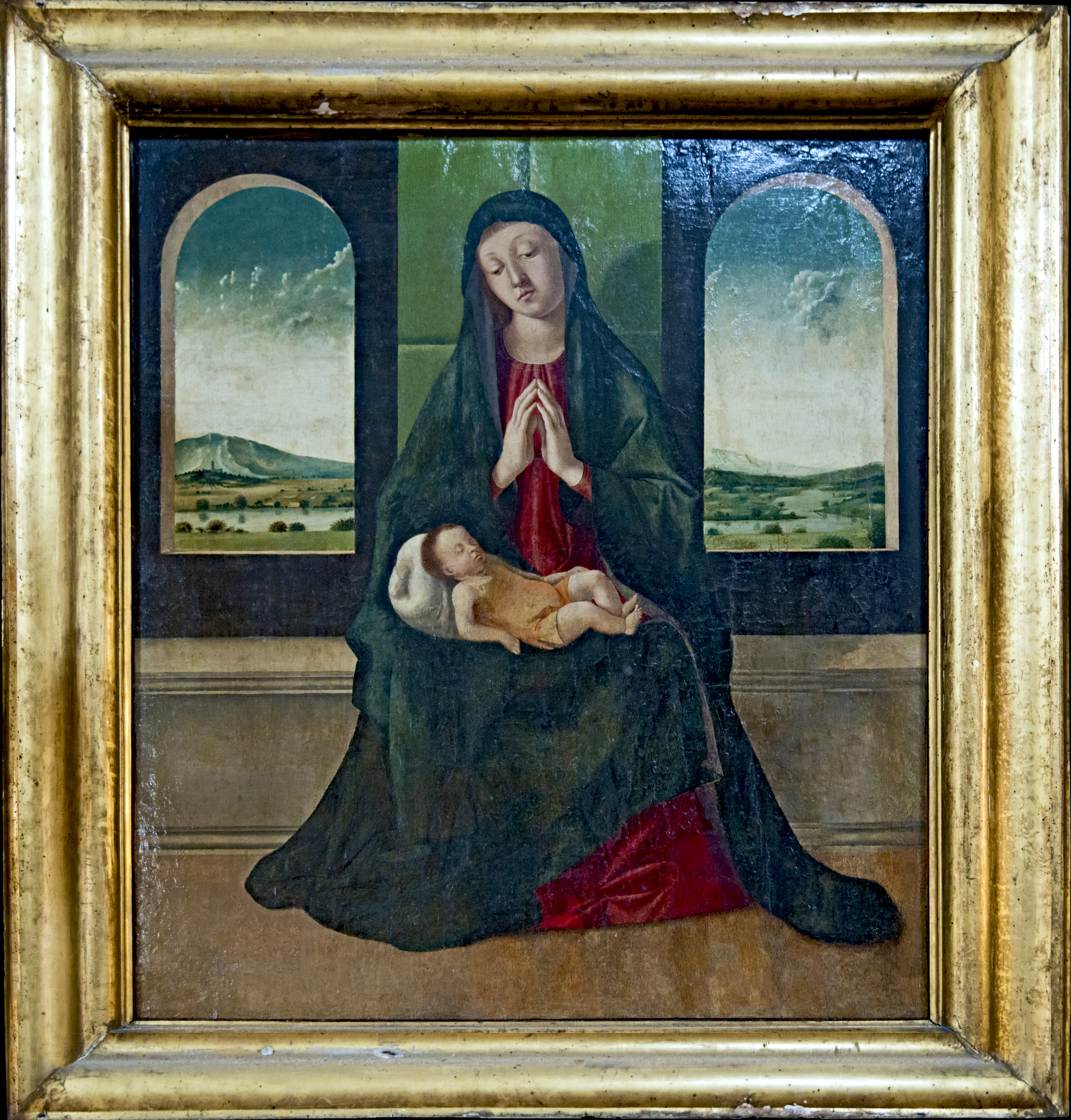
Madonna col Bambino, (1485–90)

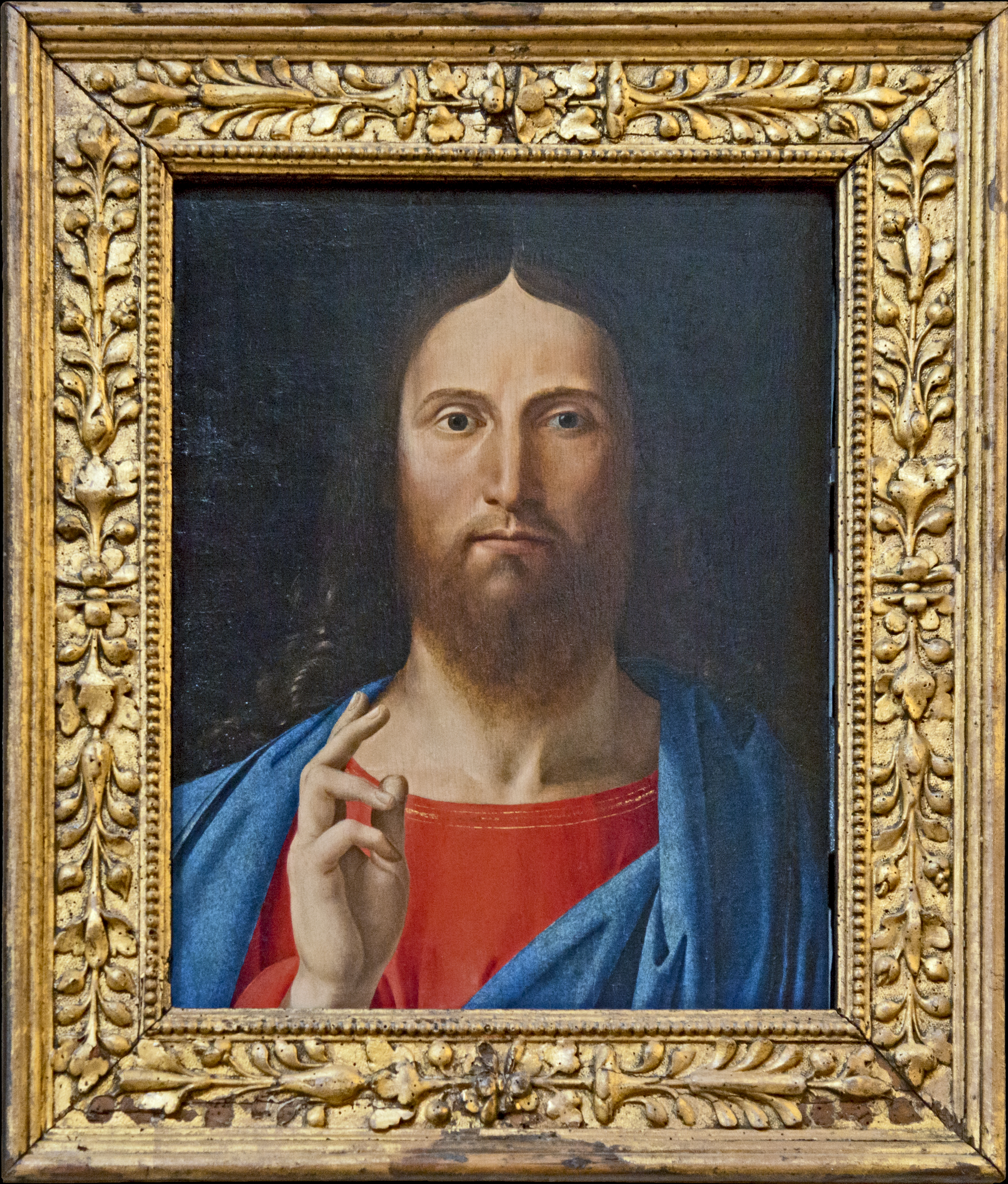
Cristo benedicente (1494)

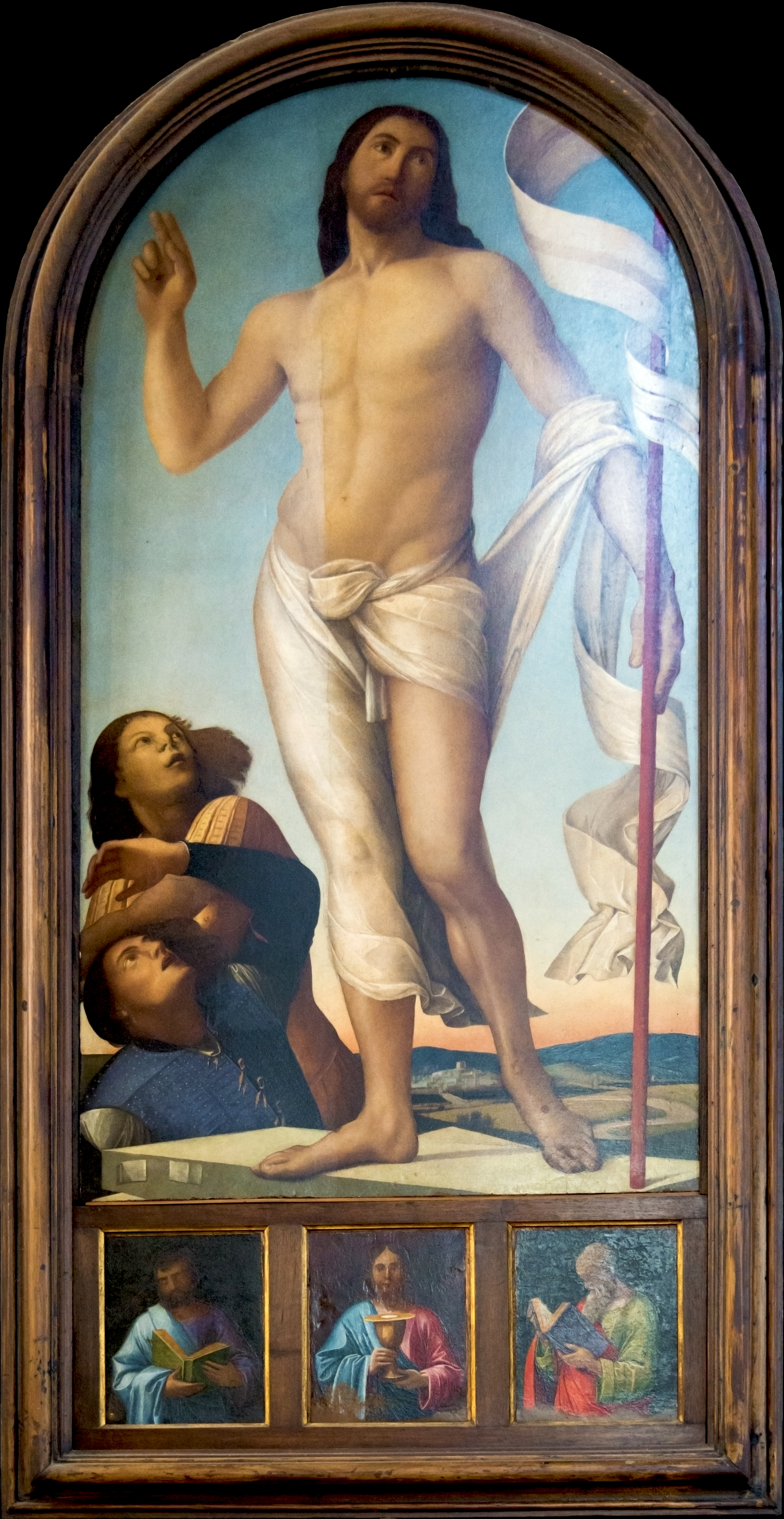
Cristo risorto, 1497–98

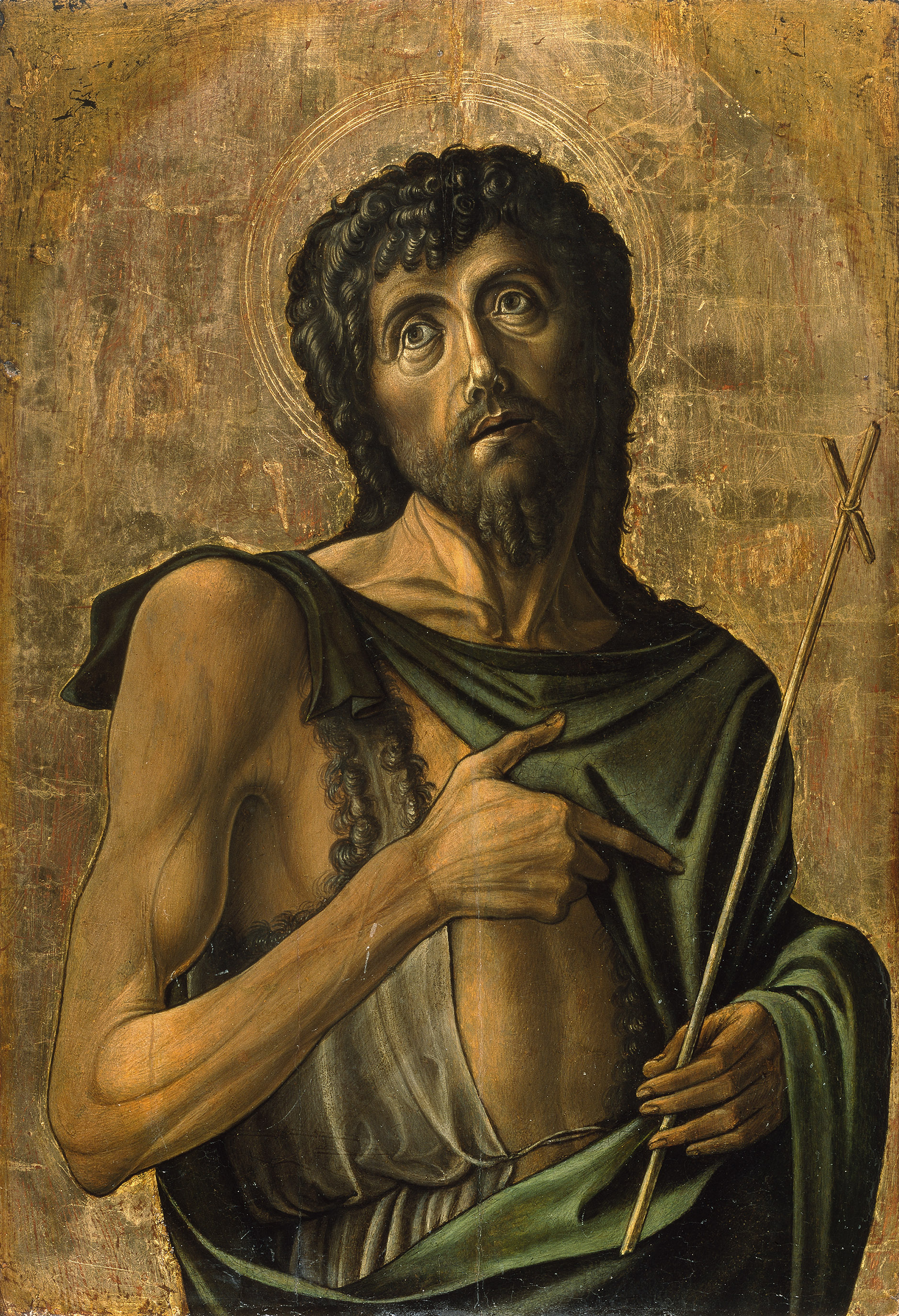
Saint John the Baptist, c. 1475.

== Sources ==
- Bryan, Michael (1889). Walter Armstrong; Robert Edmund Graves (eds.). Dictionary of Painters and Engravers, Biographical and Critical. Vol. II L-Z. London: George Bell and Sons. pp. 667–678.
