= Quirizio di Giovanni da Murano =

Italian painter

Quirizio di Giovanni da Murano or Quirizio da Murano or Quiricius (Venice fl. c. 1460 – c. 1478), was an Italian Renaissance painter of religious subjects.

== Biography ==
Little is known about this painter. He is supposed to have been a pupil of Antonio of Murano, though conjectures by critics vary about him and his work.

The probability is that he did little alone, but was one of the assistants in the Vivarini workshop.

His use of tempera is similar to the school of Murano, flat, light, and with little or no shade. His type of head is regular and well-shaped, fingers and neck long, waist very slender.

== Works ==
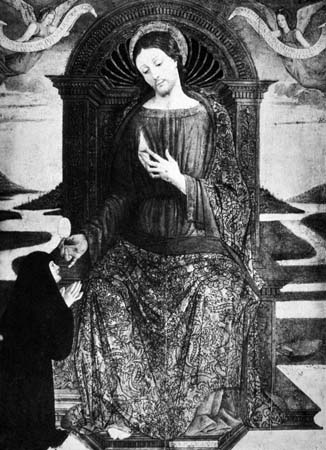
Christ Showing His Wounds and the Host to a Clarissan Nun

- The Savior / Christ Showing His Wounds and the Host to a Clarissan Nun (1460–1478) : The painting was made for the monastery of Saint Clare on Murano island and shows a rather feminine Christ holding his wounded breast. Now in the Academia in Venice, painting 87 cm × 114 cm (34 in × 45 in) tempera and oil on panel.

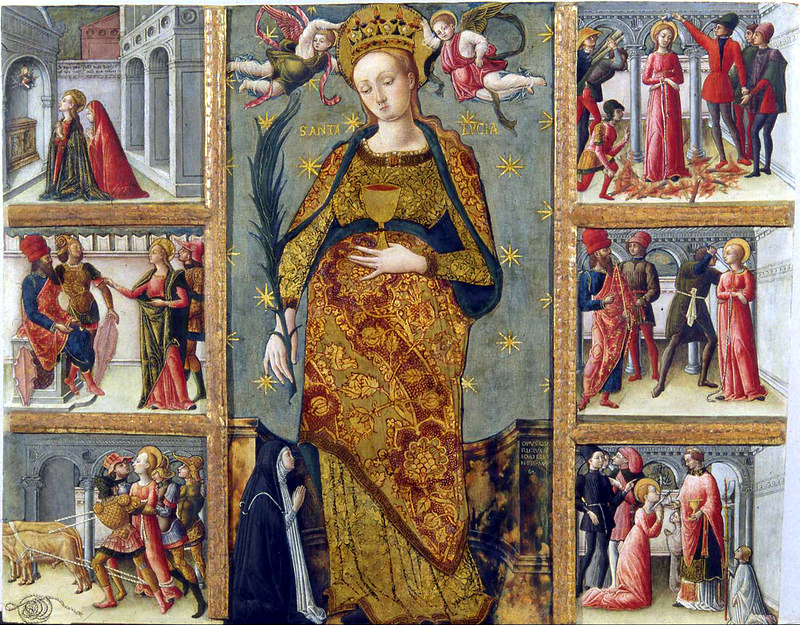
Santa Lucia e storie della sua vita

- Santa Lucia e storie della sua vita (Venice, c. 1462 – c. 1478) (tempera)
- Madonna dell'Umiltà (1461–1478) (triptych of Madonna of humility, with Saint Augustine and Saint Jerome on the left, and Saint Catherine and Saint Lucie on the right and The Virgin Adoring the Child in the center

Some of other works attributed to him may have been done by Bartolommeo Vivarini.
