= Domenico Ambrogi =

Italian painter

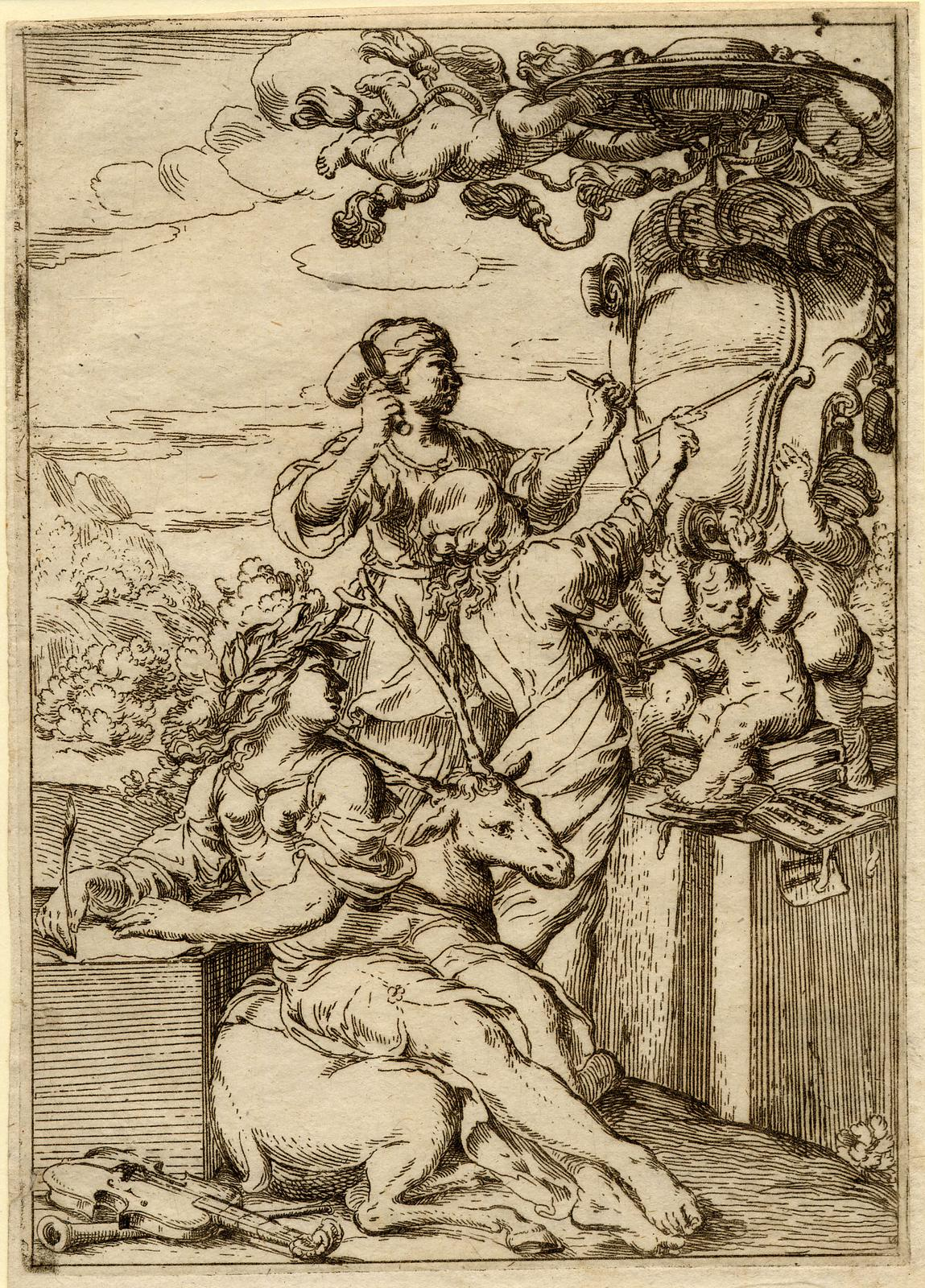
Two women symbolizing the art of painting and sculpture. The sculpture is crowned with a tasselled galero, an attribute of the Cardinals of the Catholic church. Etching, exact date unknown. In the collection of the British Museum.

Domenico Ambrogi (c. 1600–after 1678) was an Italian painter from Bologna of the 17th century, also called Menichino or Menghino del Brizio, after a master. Mainly known as a decorator of quadratura. He is also known as Domenico degli Ambrogi. He trained with Francesco Brizio, Bernardino Baldi (active 1599–1615), and Denis Calvaert.

== Biography ==
Domenico Ambrogi was born in Bologna around 1600. As a young man, he was apprenticed to Bernardino Baldi, from whom he left shortly before Bernardino Baldi died (30 Jan. 1612). After that, he studied with Denis Calvaert for a short period of time and finally, became an apprentice of Francesco Brizio. At that time, Brizio gave public lessons in drawing and perspective, and Ambrogi received the Menghino or Menichino del Brizio nickname. When he left the master, he collaborated with Girolamo Curti, known as Dentone as a painter of figures, and with Angelo Michele Colonna as a painter of "quadrature". During his last years, he made many designs for decorations and prints. He had pupils Giacinto and Pier Antonio Cerva and Giovanni Antonio Fumiani from Venice, who lived many years in his house and used his drawings to produce his first paintings. He died after 1678.

== Works ==
The works mentioned in sources:

- The frescoes in the hall and in the chapel of the Palazzo Spada (in Brisighella (Ravenna));
- The Madonna del Poggio, (the ceiling of the church of St. Maria del Poggio);
- The chapel in the villa of the Marchesi de 'Buoi;
- The loggia and two rooms in the villa of the Marquises Malvezzi (in Bagnarola);
- The frescoed ceilings of five rooms in the Ratta house (In Bologna);
- Frescoed room with stories by Rinaldo, in the house of the poet Cesare Rinaldi (In Bologna);
- The fresco under the last arch of the Annunziata portico (considered by Malvasia the first public work that Ambrogi performed without aid (In Bologna);
- All the frescoes in the chapel of St. Francis (In Bologna).

The works preserved in Bologna:

- Frescoes in the Paleotti palace (now the Student's House), first work in collaboration with Curti;
- The canvas with the Guardian Angel (in St. Giacomo, first chapel left);
- The large canvas with the Crowning of Mary (ceiling of the Oratory of St. Maria della Vita).

== Sources ==
- Farquhar, Maria (1855). Ralph Nicholson Wornum (ed.). Biographical catalogue of the principal Italian painters. London: Woodfall & Kinder. p. 6.
- Marchese Antonio Bolognini Amorini (1843). Vite de Pittori ed Artifici Bolognesi. Tipografia Governativa alla Volpe. pp. 95–97.
