= Giovanni d'Alemagna =

Italian painter

- Born: Johannes Alamanus c. 1411; Venice, Italy
- Died: 21 February 1450 (aged 38–39); Padua, Italy
- Known for: Painting

Giovanni d'Alemagna (Note: Diversely spelled Giovanni d'Alamagna, Giovanni il Tedesco, Johannes Alaman, and Johannes de Alemania, Zuane de Murano, and Zuane da Murano. This article uses the most common spelling. See Boni 1840, p. 429, Paoletti & Radke 2005, p. 318, Humfrey 1995, p. 49, Fiorillo 1801, p. 12, Fabian et al. 2000, p. 383, Füssli 1816, p. 3099.) (Italian pronunciation: [dʒoˈvanni daleˈmaɲɲa]; born Johannes Alamanus; c. 1411 – 9 July 1450) was a Venetian renaissance painter of German ancestry, active in Italy, with his brother-in-law Antonio Vivarini on religious paintings in Venice and Padua, that are preserved in the named cities together with those of Vivarini. (Note: The paintings have the epigraphs, which has been transmitted in different spellings like Zuane and Antonio de Muran pense, Zuane and Antonio da Muran pense, Zuane and Antonio da Muran pense 1444. See Boni 1840, p. 429, Lanzi 1828, p. 22.)

== Biography ==
Giovanni d'Alemagna is remembered above all for the work done in Venice, characterized by decorative forms that recall Nordic influence. Between 1430 and 1435 he created a cycle called Stories of Christ, which are still exhibited at the Ca' d'Oro.

According to Ridolfo and Zanetti, Giovanni and Antonio Vivarini flourished about the year 1440, where they adduce authority for an altar-piece in San Pantalon, which bears the inscription of Zuane e Antonio da Muran pense 1444.

Although it is difficult to distinguish the two artists' contributions, Giovanni is associated with the St Jerome (1444), which carries the signature 'Johannes'. This painting suggests that Giovanni's work was generally flatter and more decorative than Antonio's more naturalistic style.

Giovanni d'Alemagna and Antonio Vivarini ran an shop in Venice that specialized in multi-tiered, multi-paneled altarpieces and fanciful Gothic frames, which they subcontracted to various woodworkers.

Giovanni and Antonio signed and dated the triptych representing the Enthroned Madonna with Child and Saints for the wall behind the officers' bench of the recently expanded meeting room of the Scuola della Carità (now part of the Gallerie dell'Accademia, a result of the collaboration made in 1446 for this room of the hotel. (Note: (Book excerpt—original in italian by Manzutto): Il grandioso trittico, splendido frutto della stretta collaborazione fra Antonio Vivarini e il cognato Giovanni d'Alemagna, fu eseguito nel 1446 per questa stessa sala dell'Albergo (in origine peró sulla parete di fronte alla Presentazione di Tiziano). Vivace e ricca ne é l'orchestrazione coloristica, scintillante d'oro non solo negli ornati a pastiglia, ma anchi in tutti quei particolari che la raffinata fantasia dei due artisti volle impreziosire. (Book excerpt—translated into english): The grandiose triptych, a splendid result of the close collaboration between Antonio Vivarini and his brother-in-law Giovanni d'Alemagna, was made in 1446 for this room of the hotel (originally however on the wall opposite Titian's Presentation). Lively and rich is the coloristic orchestration, sparkling with gold not only in the pastille ornaments, but also in all those details that the refined imagination of the two artists wanted to embellish.) Resembling an altarpiece but functioning as an inducement to good decision making, this monumental painting shows the four doctors of the Church (Sts Gregory and Jerome at the left, Ambrose and Augustine at the right) in a courtyard around a massive Madonna and Child. The Virgin's celestial court is vividly rendered with marbled pink and grey architecture, rich deep colours, costly robes, and lovingly observed plant life.

In 1448, he worked at Vivarini's workshop, which was moved to Padua, together with Andrea Mantegna and Nicolò Pizolo, in the decoration of the Ovetari Chapel, but died soon afterwards.

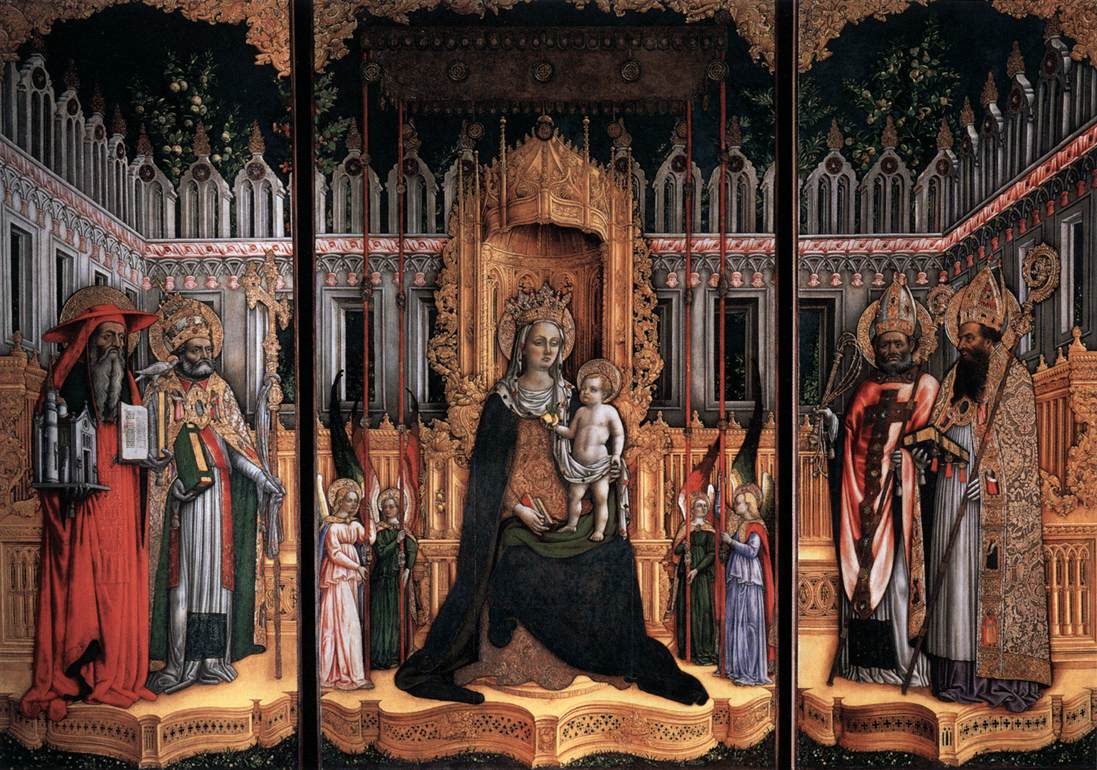
Enthroned Madonna with Child and Saints Gregory and Jerome (left), Ambrose and Augustine (right) Triptych by Giovanni d'Alemagna and Antonio Vivarini (1446), Gallerie dell'Accademia

He was the tutor of Quirizio da Murano, the exact date is unknown today.

== Works ==
- Triptych of Saint Jerome, Kunsthistorisches Museum, Vienna
- Decorations of the frescoes in the Ovetari chapel, Church of the Eremitani

=== In Venice ===
- Polyptych of the Body of Christ "or the Sepulcher", 1433, with Antonio Vivarini, Church of San Zaccaria, Chapel of San Tarasio, Venice
- Polyptych of Saint Sabina, 1443 and Polyptych of the Virgin with Antonio Vivarini, San Zaccaria Church, San Tarasio chapel
- Coronation of the Virgin, 1444 with Antonio Vivarini, Church of San Pantalon, Venice
- Triptych of the Virgin and child in majesty surrounded by angels between the doctors of the Church (saints Gregory, Jerome, Ambroise and Augustine, 1446, with Antonio Vivarini, tempera on panels, central 339 cm × 200 cm and two sides of 339 cm × 138 cm each, Gallerie dell'Accademia de Venise, Venice.

== Bibliography ==
- Boni, Filippo de (1840). Biografia degli artisti [Biography of the artists] (in Italian). Vol. 1. Venice: Tipi del Gondoliere.
- Füssli, Johann Heinrich (1816). Allgemeines Künstlerlexicon [General artist dictionary] (in German). Zurich: Orell, Füssli und Compagnie.
- Paoletti, John T.; Radke, Gary M. (2005). Art in Renaissance Italy (3 ed.). London: Laurence King Publishing. ISBN 1856694399.
- Fiorillo, Johann Dominicus (1801). Geschichte der zeichnenden Künste von ihrer Wiederauflebung bis auf die neuesten Zeiten [History of the drawing arts from their revival to the latest times] (in German). Göttingen: Johann Friedrich Röwer.
- Humfrey, Peter (1995). Painting in Renaissance Venice. Yale University Press. ISBN 9780300067156.
- Fabian, Claudia; Klier, Ute; Meßmer, Gabriele; Rebhan, Helga; Stephan-Bahle, Renate; Dannhauer, Paul Gerhard; Grönbold, Günter; Ott, Sonja; Riesterer, Winfried; et al. ((Cholawka, Nadia), (Richter, Sigrid), (Tafferna, Lioba)) (2000). Personennamen des Mittelalters : PMA : Namensformen für 13,000 Personen gemäss den Regeln für die alphabetische Katalogisierung (RAK) [Medieval personal names: MPN: Name forms for 13,000 people according to the rules for alphabetical cataloging (RAC)] (2 ed.). Munich: Saur. ISBN 3598114001.
- Lanzi, Luigi (1828). The School of Venice. Vol. 3. Translated by Roscoe, Thomas. W. Simpkin and R. Marshall, Stationers'-Hall Court, Ludgate Street.
- Levey, Michael (1987). Od Giotta do Cézanne'a : zarys historii malarstwa zachodnioeuropejskiego [From Giotta to Cézanne: an outline of the history of Western European painting] (4 ed.). Warszawa: Arkady. ISBN 83-213-3050-9.
- Manzutto, Giuliano; Nicolini, Toni (1985). Venezia (in Italian). Vol. 7. Touring Editore. ISBN 88-365-0006-4.
- Meyer, Julius (1872). Allgemeines Künstler-Lexikon [General artist encyclopedia] (in German). Vol. 1. Leipzig: Engelmann.
- Scirè, Giovanna Nepi (2008). La peinture dans les musées de Venise [Painting in the museums of Venice] (in Italian). Paris: Éditions Place des Victoires. ISBN 978-2-8099-0019-4.
