= Bartolomeo Vivarini =

Italian painter

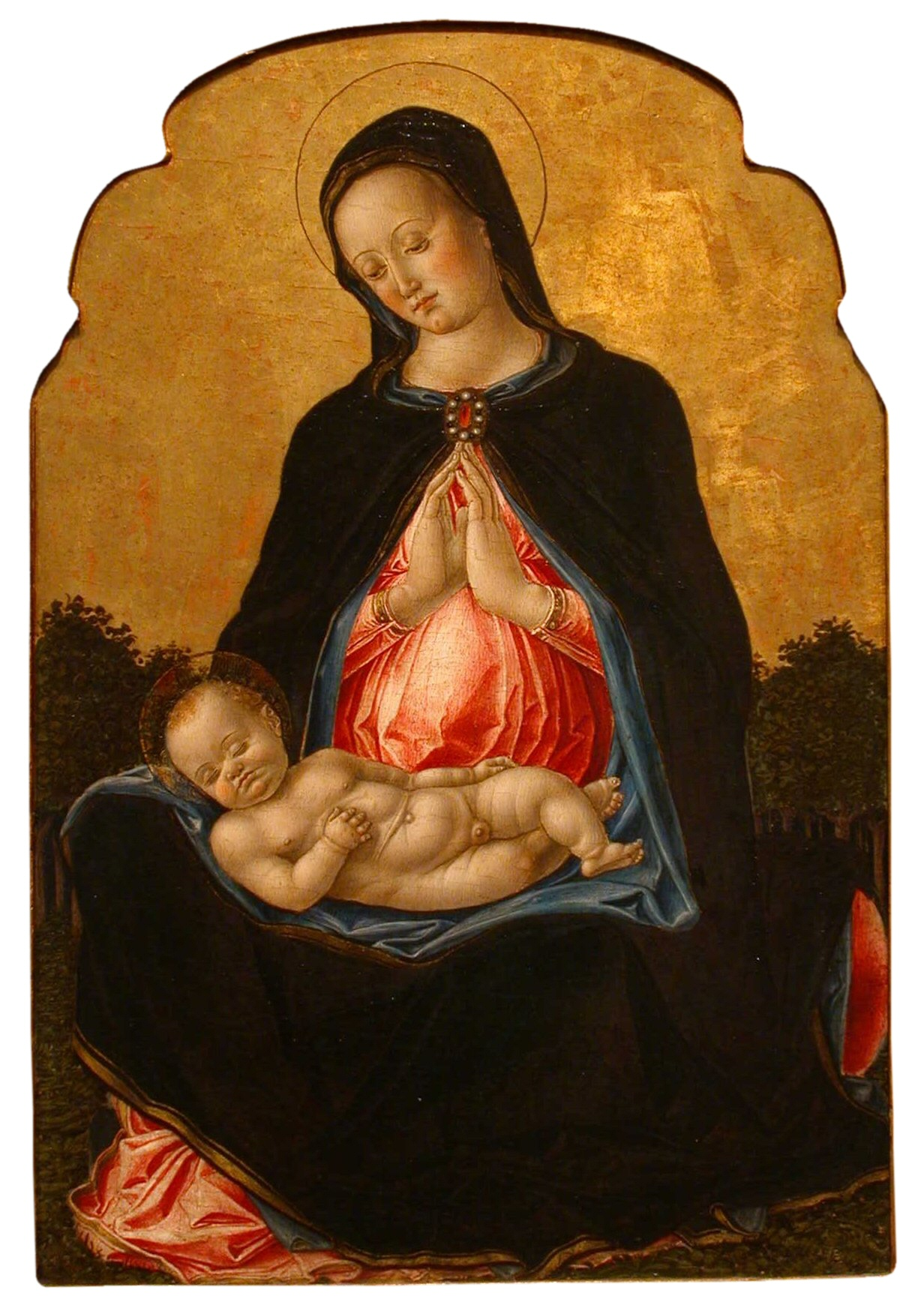
Madonna and Child, tempera and gold on panel painting by Bartolomeo Vivarini, c. 1475, Honolulu Museum of Art

Bartolomeo or Bartolommeo Vivarini (c. 1432 – c. 1499) was an Italian Renaissance painter, known to have worked from 1450 to 1499.

== Biography ==
Bartolomeo's brother Antonio Vivarini, and his nephew (also possibly his pupil) Alvise Vivarini, were also painters.

He learned oil painting from Antonello da Messina, and is said to have produced, in 1473, the first oil picture done in Venice. Housed in the basilica of San Zanipolo, it is a large altar-piece in nine divisions, representing Augustine and other saints.

Most of his works, however, are in tempera. His outline is always hard, and his colour good; the figures have much dignified and devout expression. As "vivarino" means in Italian a goldfinch, he sometimes drew a goldfinch as the signature of his pictures. The Getty Museum, Harvard University Art Museums, the Honolulu Museum of Art, the Louvre, the Museum of Fine Arts, Boston, the National Gallery of Art (Washington D.C.), the National Gallery, London, the New Orleans Museum of Art, the Philadelphia Museum of Art, Pinacoteca Ambrosiana (Milan), Pinacoteca Nazionale di Bologna, Pinacoteca Provinciale di Bari, the Rijksmuseum and the Uffizi are among the public collections holding works by Bartolomeo Vivarini.

== Gallery ==
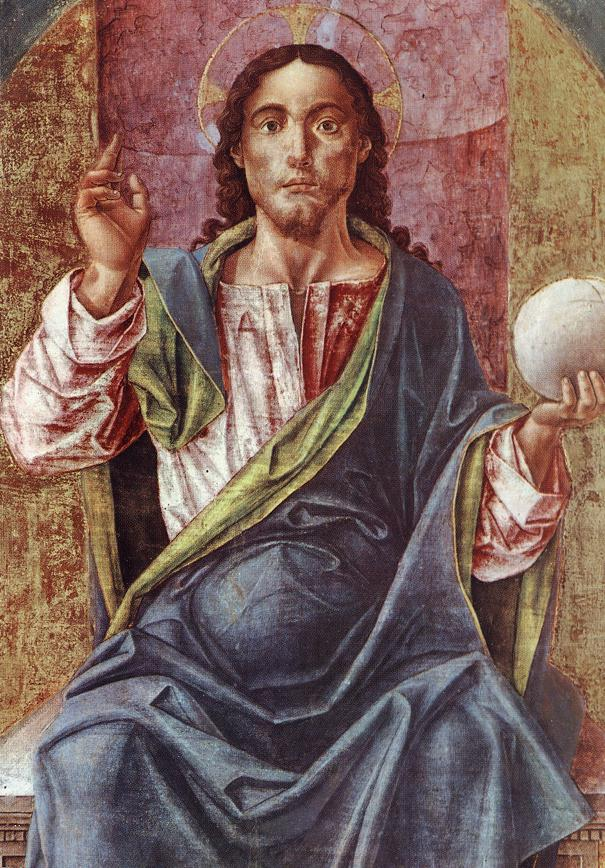
Christ Enthroned by Bartolomeo Vivarini, 1450

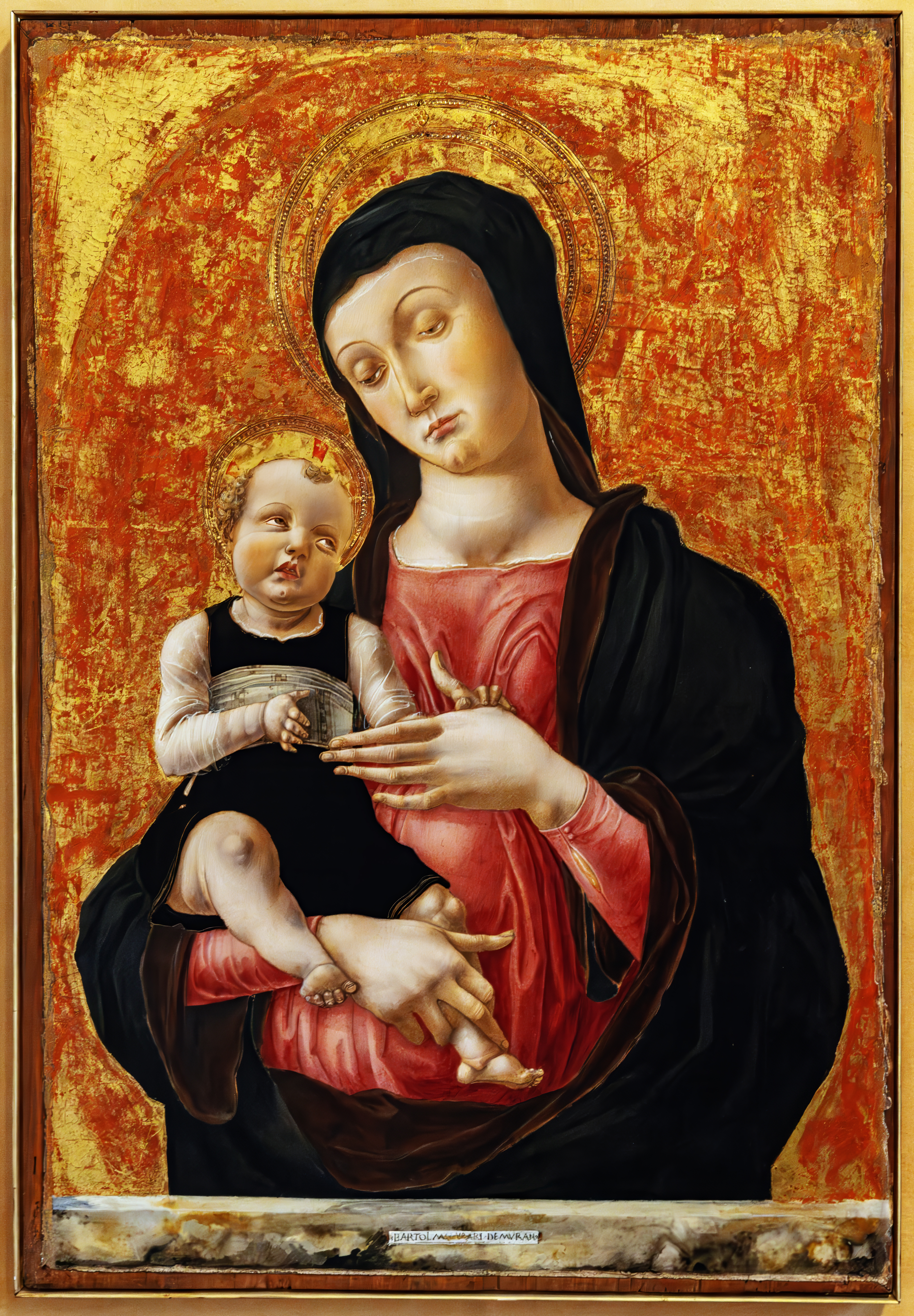
Madonna and Child, 1465 Museo Correr

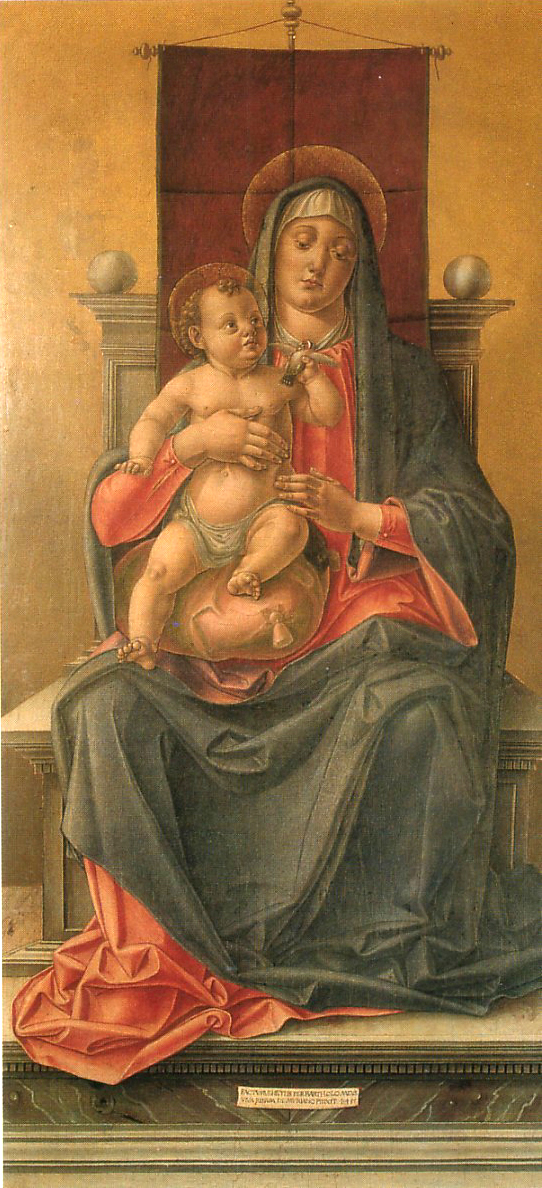
Madonna in trono, painting by Bartolomeo Vivarini

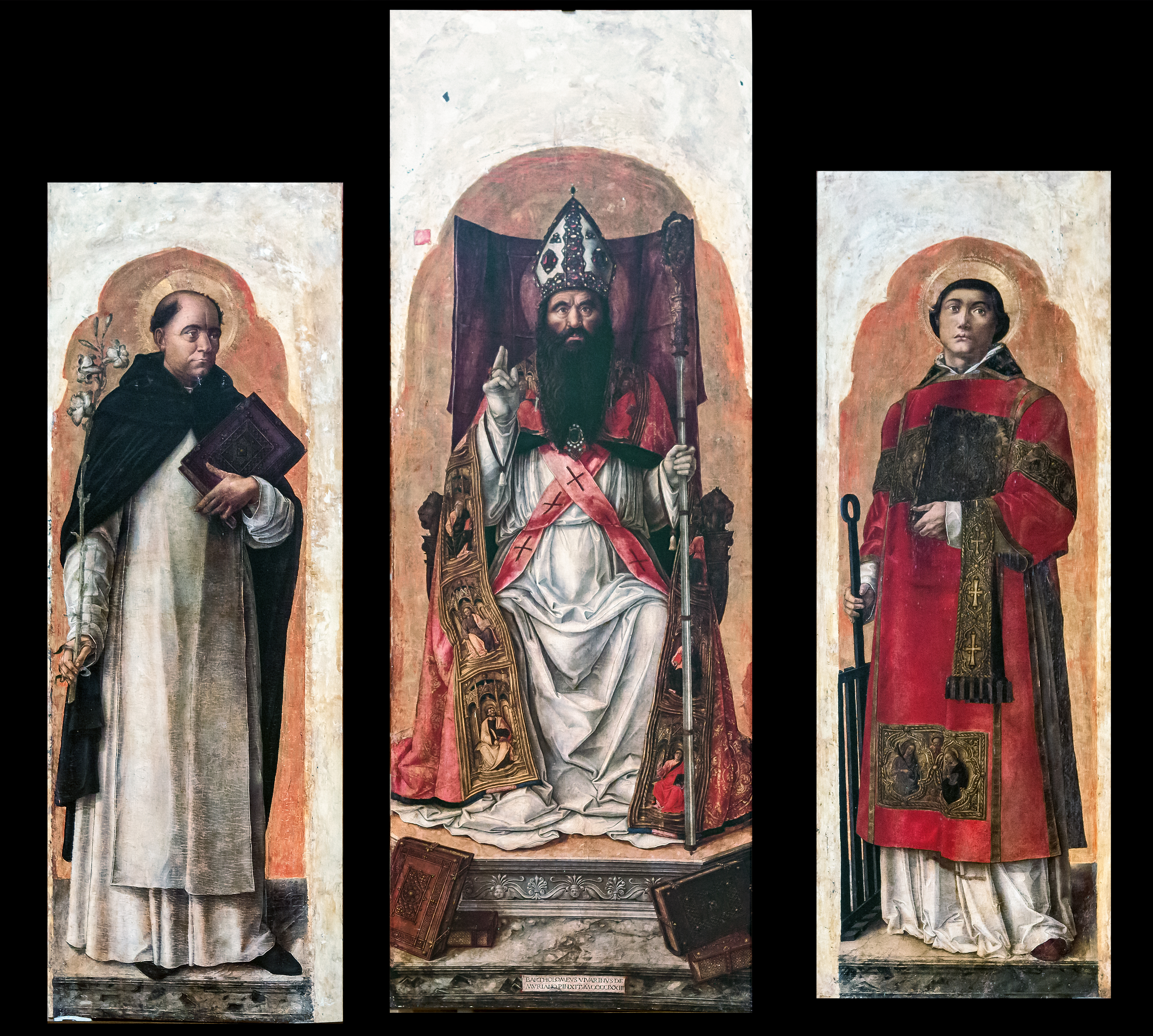
Polyptych of San Zanipolo 1473

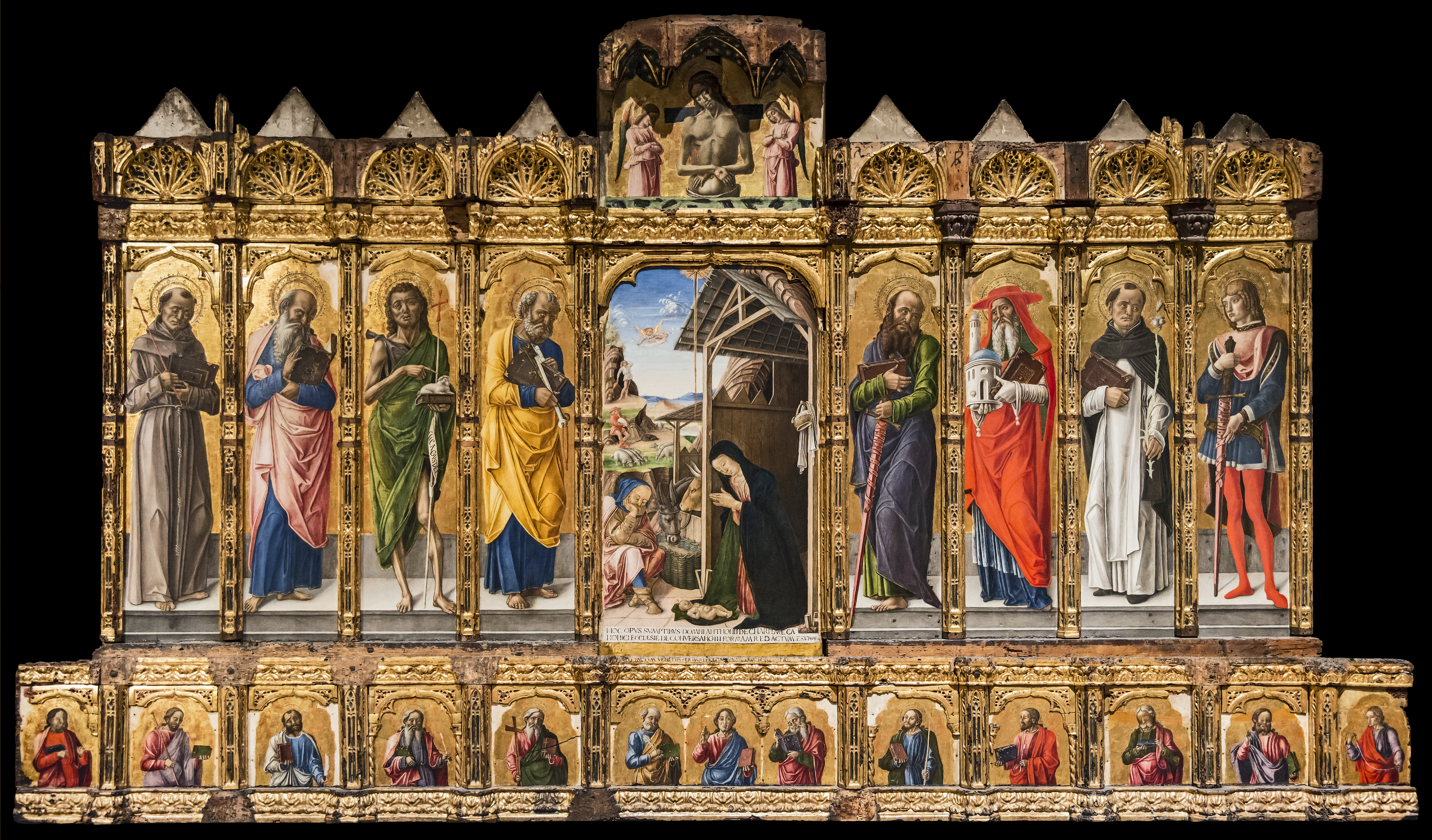
Conversano Polyptych, 1475
