= Antonio Vivarini =

Italian painter

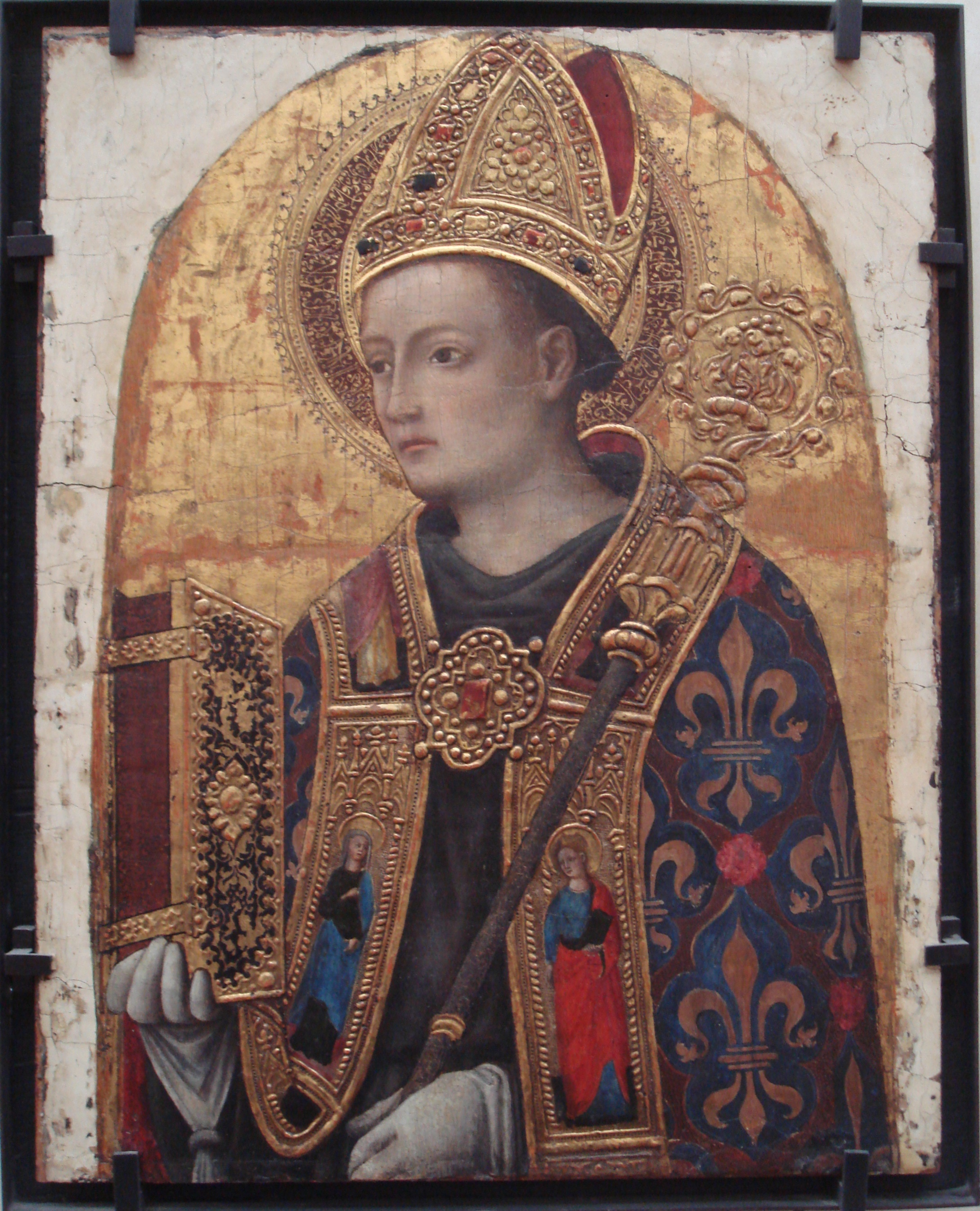
Saint Louis de Toulouse, 1450

Antonio Vivarini (Antonio of Murano) (fl. c. 1440 – c. 1480) was an Italian painter of the early Renaissance-late Gothic period, who worked mostly in the Republic of Venice. He is probably the earliest of a family of painters, which was descended from a family of glassworkers active in Murano. The painting dynasty included his younger brother Bartolomeo and Antonio's son Alvise Vivarini.

== Life ==
He initially trained with Andrea da Murano, and his works show the influence of Gentile da Fabriano. The earliest known date of a picture of his, an altar-piece in the Accademia is 1440; the latest, in the Vatican Museums, 1464, but he appears to have been alive in 1470.

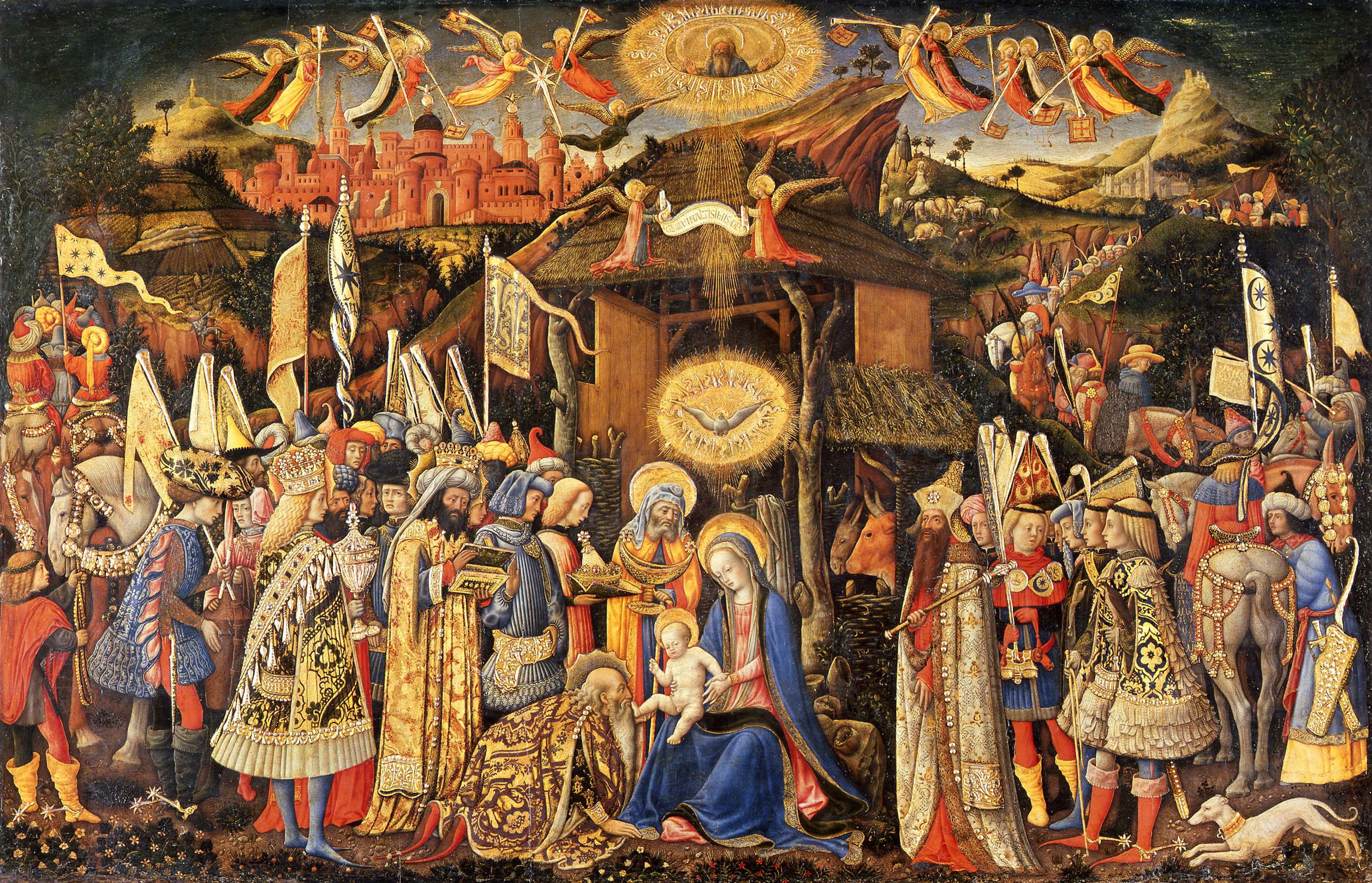
Adoration of the Magi, 1418

He collaborated with his brother-in-law, Giovanni d'Alemagna (also known as "Joannes de Alemania"), who sometimes has been regarded as a brother (Giovanni of Murano). There is no trace of this painter after 1447. From then on, Antonio painted either alone or together with his younger brother Bartolommeo in Padua. The works of Antonio are well drawn for their epoch, with a certain noticeable degree of softness, and with good flesh and other tints. He was probably influenced by Mantegna, and worked with him in the Ovetari Chapel in 1450–51. It is sometimes difficult to assign authorship for works from the Vivarini studio.

Three of his principal paintings are the Enthroned Madonna Virgin with the Four Doctors of the Church, the Coronation of the Virgin and Saints Peter and Jerome. The first two (in which Giovanni participated) are in the Venetian academy, the third in the National Gallery, London.

Though Alvise developed an interest in spatial coherence and solid form towards the end of the century, the Vivarini workshop, overall, continued to embody a traditional Gothic-influenced approach for much longer.
