= List of painters and architects of Venice =

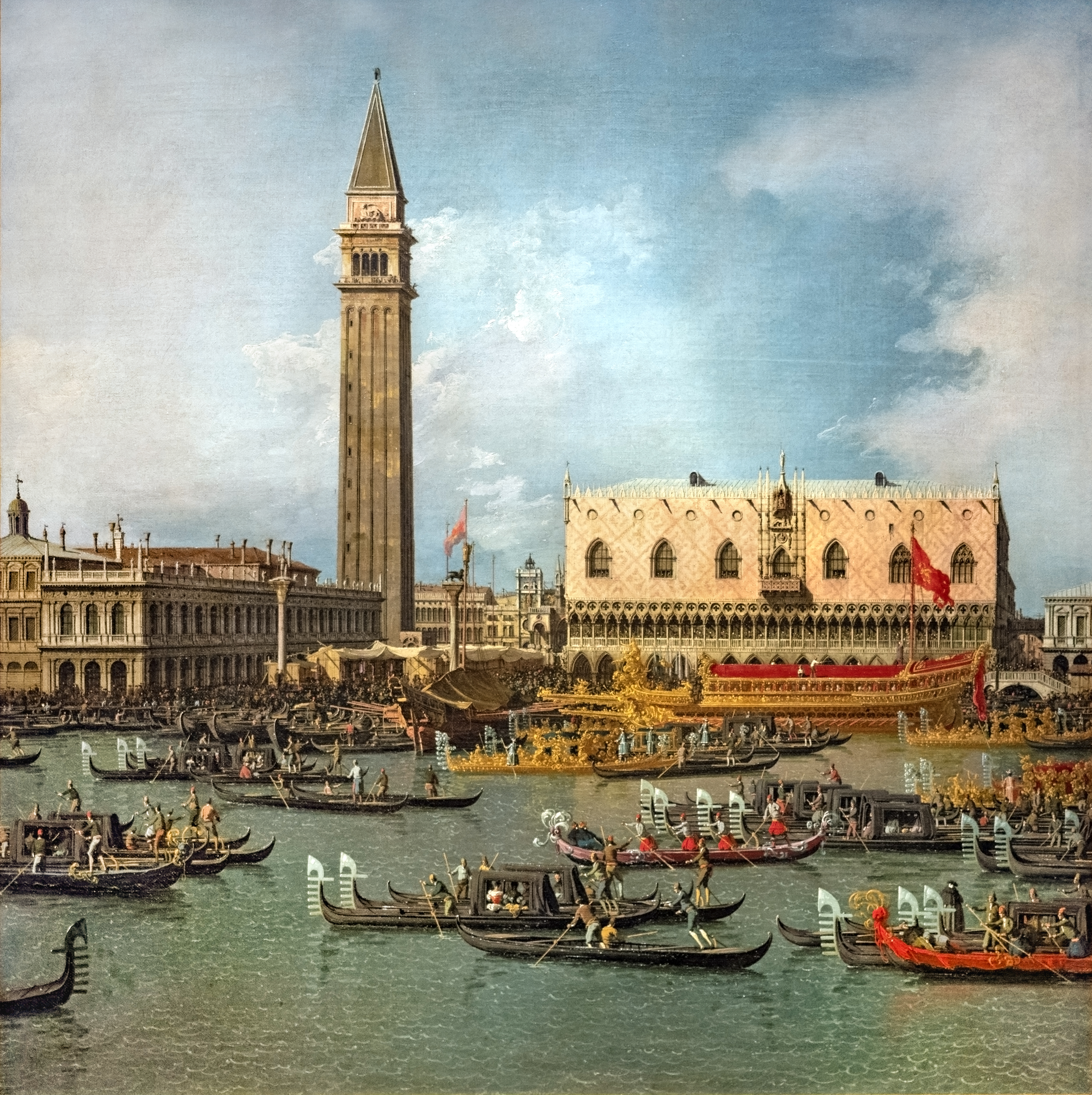
Canaletto (Giovanni Antonio Canal)

The list of painters and architects of Venice includes notable painters and architects who have a significant connection to the Italian city of Venice. It is not yet a complete list and additional contributions are welcome.

== A ==
- Antonio Abbondi (d. 1549), architect
- Jacopo Amigoni (1682–1752), painter, started career in Venice
- Giuseppe Angeli (1712–1798), painter
- Giovanni da Asola (16th century)

== B ==
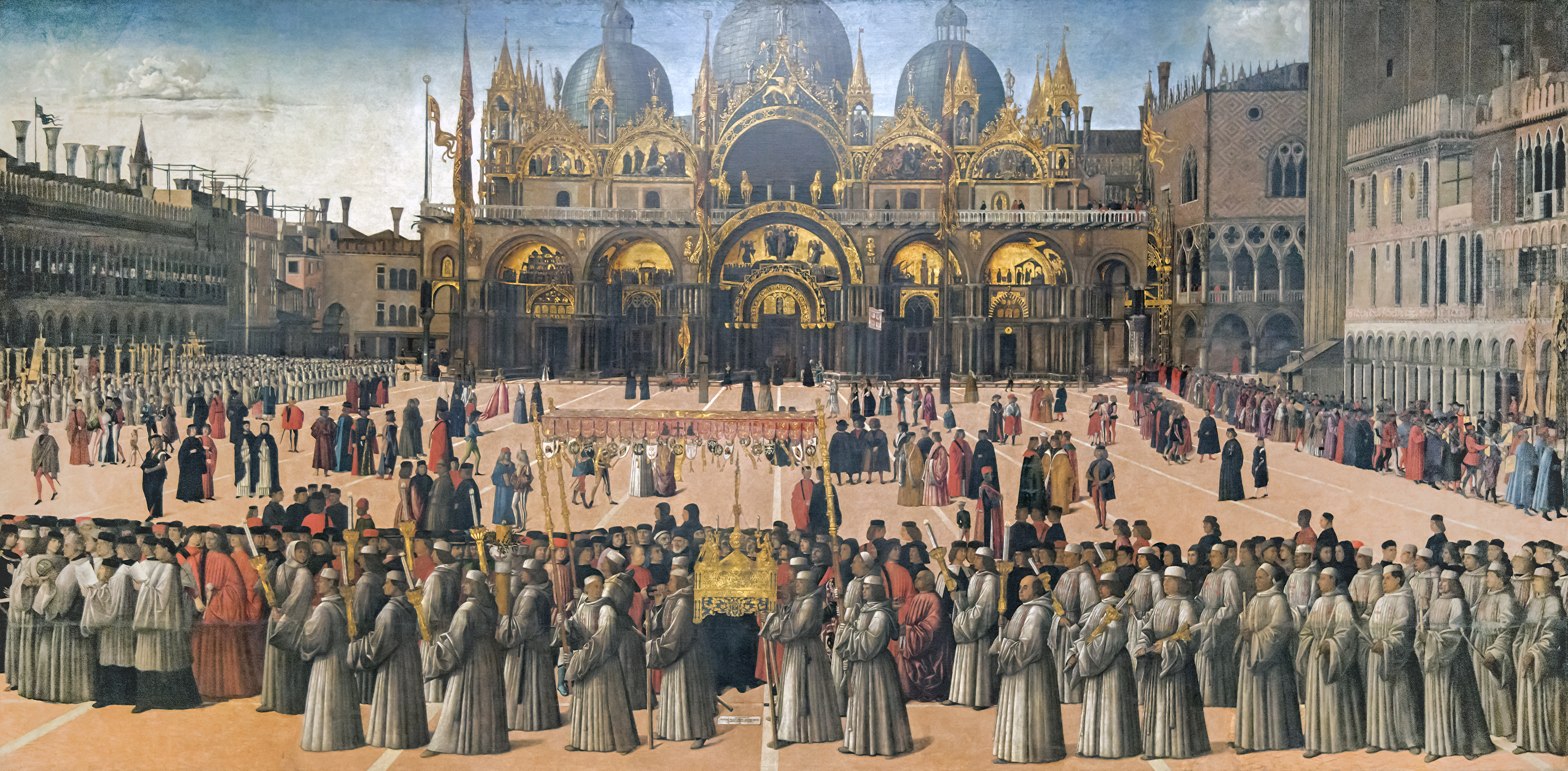
Gentile Bellini, Procession in St. Mark's Square

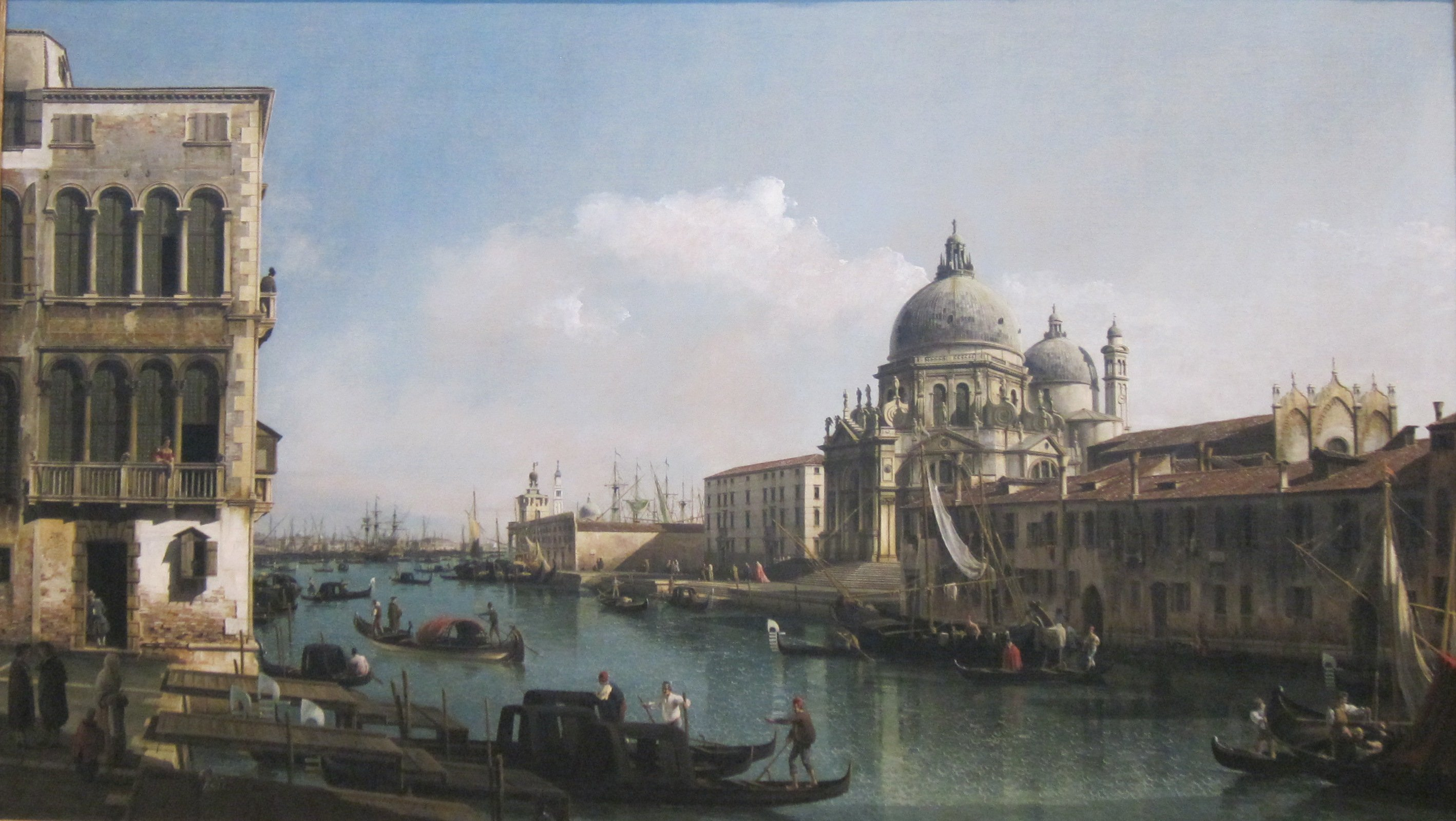
Bernardo Bellotto, View of the Grand Canal: Santa Maria della Salute and the Dogana from Campo Santa Maria Zobenigo

- Niccolò Bambini (1651–1736), painter
- Marco Basaiti (c. 1470–1530), painter, rival to Giovanni Bellini
- Pietro Baseggio (14th century), architect and sculptor
- Francesco Bassano the Younger (1549–1592), painter, eldest son of Jacopo Bassano
- Jacopo Bassano (1510–1592), painter
- Leandro da Ponte Bassano (1557–1622), painter, third son of Jacopo Bassano
- Lazzaro Bastiani (1449–1512), painter, teacher of Vittore Carpaccio
- Gentile Bellini (c. 1429–1507), official portrait artist for the Doges of Venice
- Giovanni Bellini (c. 1430–1516), painter, probably the best known of the Bellini family
- Jacopo Bellini (c. 1400–c. 1470), painter, father of Gentile and Giovanni Bellini
- Bernardo Bellotto (c. 1721/1722–1780), urban landscape painter and printmaker
- Giuseppe Benoni (1618–1684), architect
- Eugene de Blaas (1843–1932), painter in the Academic Classicism school
- Boccaccio Boccaccino (c. 1467–c. 1525), painter belonging to the Emilian school
- Camillo Boito (1836–1914), architect and engineer
- Bartolomeo Bon (d. after 1464), architect and sculptor
- Giovanni Bon (1355–1443), architect, father of Bartolomeo Bon
- Paris Bordone (1500–1571), painter who trained with Titian
- Giuseppe Borsato (1771–1849), painter
- Mattia Bortoloni (1696–1750), painter
- Ferruccio Bortoluzzi (1920–2007), painter

== C ==
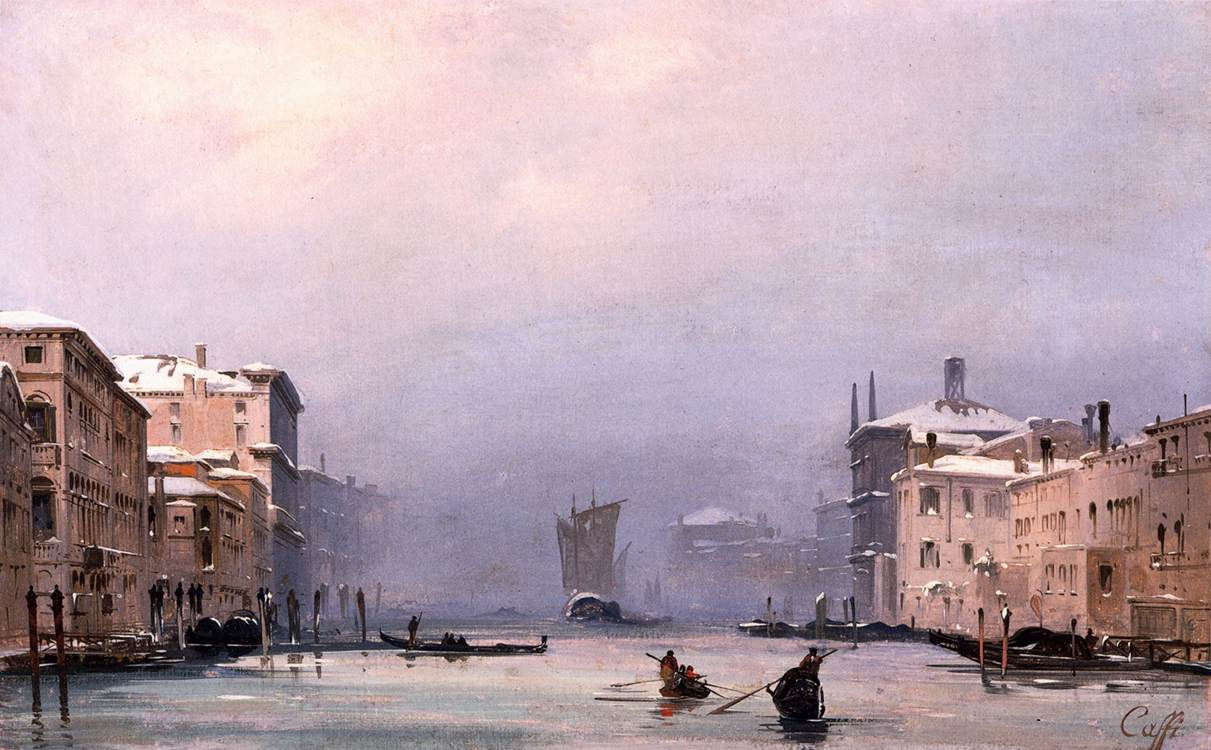
Ippolito Caffi, Snow and Fog on the Grand Canal

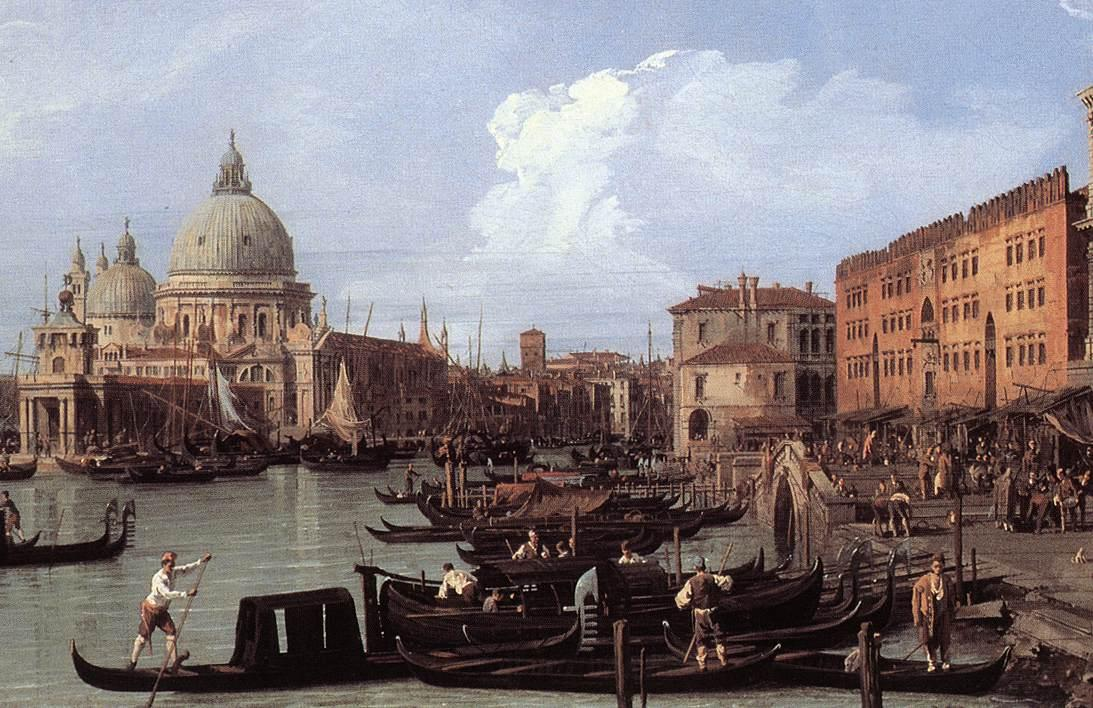
Canaletto (Bernardo Bellotto), The Molo

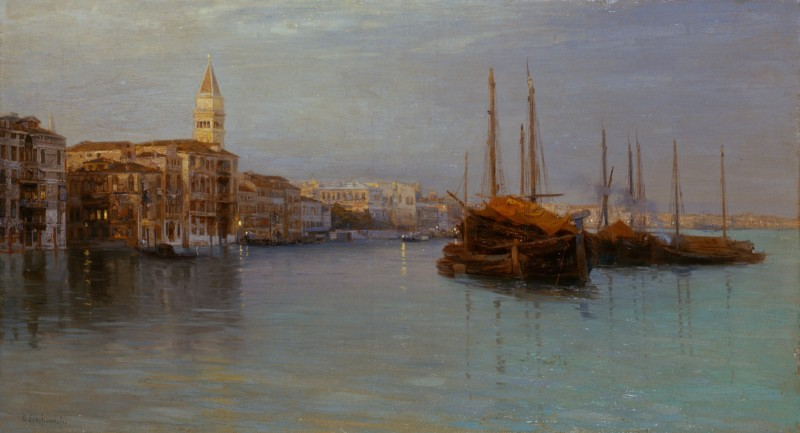
Guglielmo Ciardi, Sera - Canal Grande

- Ippolito Caffi (1814–1866), painter of architecture and seascapes
- Filippo Calendario (d. 1355), architect of the Doges Palace; executed for treason
- Canaletto (1697–1768), painter and printmaker
- Giovanni Candi (d. 1506), architect, designer of the Bovolo House (1499)
- Domenico Caprioli (1494–1528), painter
- Luca Carlevaris (1663–1730), painter and engraver
- Vittore Carpaccio (c. 1465–1525/6), painter who studied under Gentile Bellini
- Giulio Carpioni (1613–1678), painter and etcher
- Rosalba Carriera (1675–1757), painter, known for her miniatures and pastels
- Andrea del Castagno (c. 1421–1457), painter who worked briefly in Venice 1442–1443
- Bernardino Castelli (1750–1810), painter who did the portrait of Ludovico Manin, the last Doge
- Vincenzo Catena (c. 1470–1531), painter
- Costantino Cedini (1741–1811), fresco painter
- Andrea Celesti (1637–1712), painter of the Baroque period, working in Venice
- Vincenzo Chilone (1758–1839), painter of vedute
- Guglielmo Ciardi (1842–1917), painter
- Mauro Codussi (1440–1504), architect
- Andrea Cominelli, designer of the main facade of Palazzo Labia
- Cima da Conegliano (c. 1459–c. 1517), painter
- Antonio Contin (1566–1600), designed and built the Bridge of Sighs (1600)
- Leonardo Corona (1561–1605), painter, probably a pupil of Titian
- Carlo Crivelli (c. 1435–c. 1495), painter, born in Venice

== D ==
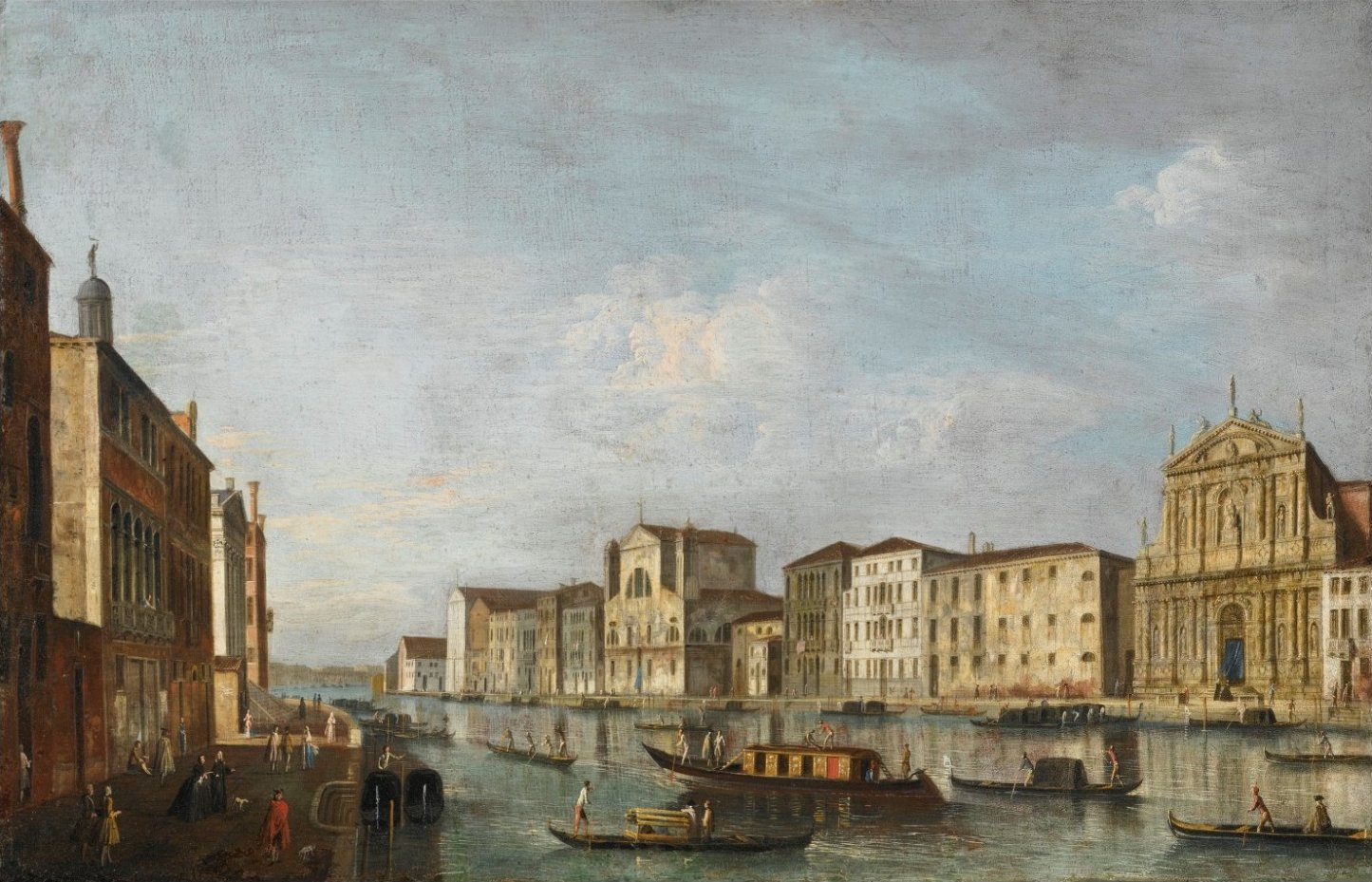
Apollonio Domenichini, Venice, A View of the Grand Canal with the Churches of Santa Lucia and the Scalzi

- Vincenzo dalle Destre (before 1488–before 1543), painter
- Gaspare Diziani (1689–1757), painter, of paintings and theatre scenery
- Apollonio Domenichini (1715–c.1770), painter of vedute

== F ==
- Giacomo Favretto (1849–1887), painter
- Domenico Fetti (c. 1589–1623), painter
- Francesco Fontebasso (1707–1769), painter, apprenticed to Sebastiano Ricci
- Girolamo Forabosco (1605–1679), painter
- Gian Antonio Fumiani (1645–1710), painter

== G ==
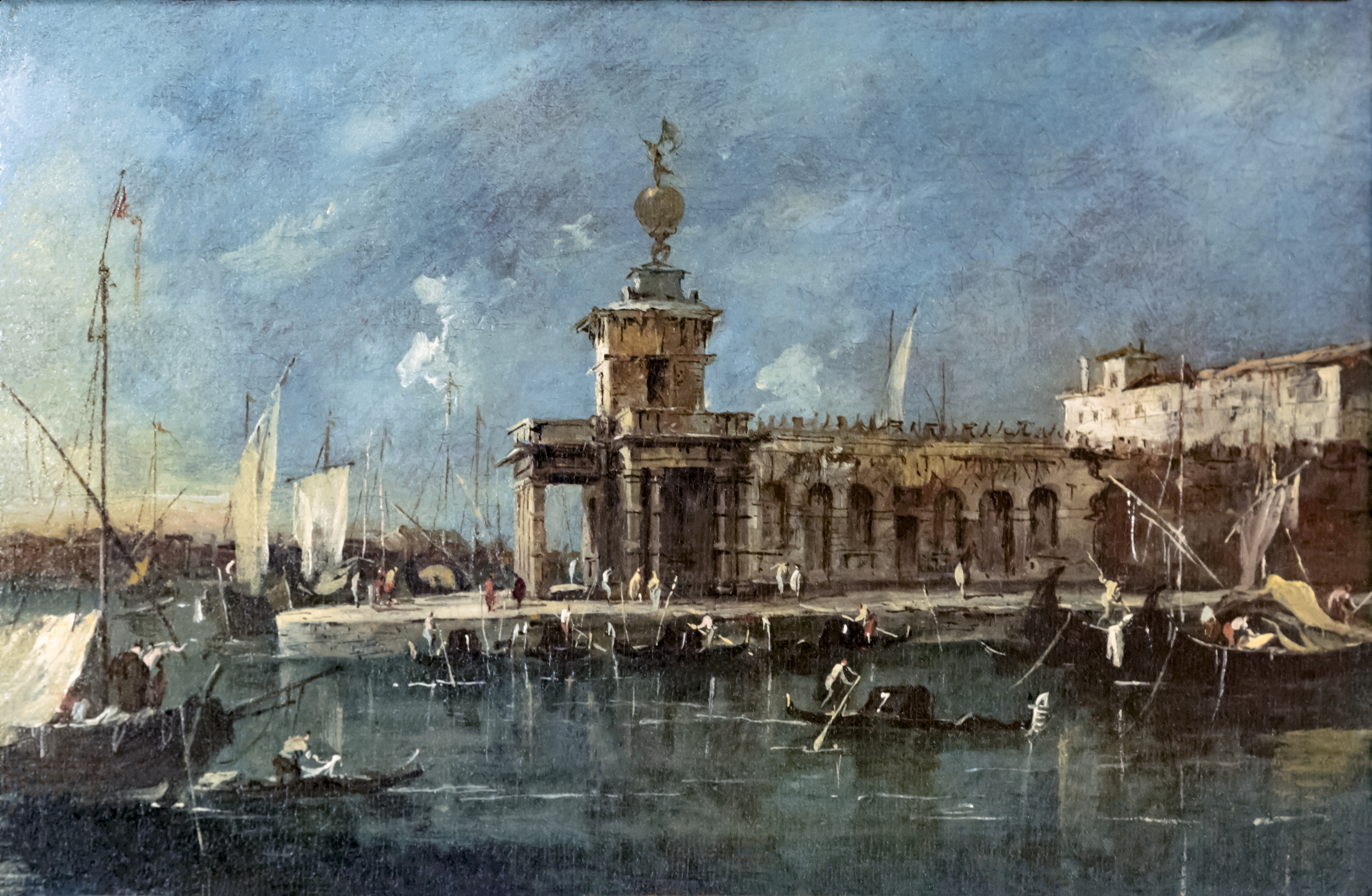
Francesco Guardi, View of Punta di Dogana in Venice

- Antonio Gambello (mid-1400s), architect and sculptor
- Antonio Gaspari (late 17th century), architect, student of Baldassare Longhena
- Giuseppe Vittore Ghislandi or Fra' Galgario (1655–1743), painter, trained in Venice
- Michele Giambono (c. 1400–c. 1462), painter and mosaic maker
- Giorgione (c. 1477/8–1510), painter, with Titian founded the Venetian school of Renaissance Painting
- Giovanni d'Alemagna (c. 1411–1450), German painter who worked in Venice
- Guglielmo dei Grigi (c. 1485–1550), architect and sculptor, designed the Palazzo dei Camerlenghi
- Jacopo Guarana (1720–1808), painter, president of the Academy of Venetian painting
- Francesco Guardi (1712–1793), painter
- Gianantonio Guardi (1699–1760), painter, one of the founders of the Venetian Academy
- Guariento (mid-1300s), Paduan painter, worked on the great council-hall of Venice

== H ==
- Francesco Hayez (1791–1881), painter, born and studied in Venice

== J ==
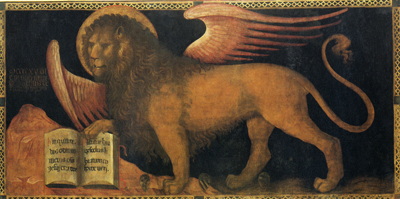
Jacobello del Fiore, The Lion of St. Mark

- Jacobello del Fiore (c. 1370–1439), painter, teacher of Carlo Crivelli

== L ==
- Cesare Laurenti (1854–1936), painter, lived in Venice from 1881
- Gregorio Lazzarini (1657–1730), painter, born in Venice
- Pietro Liberi (1605–1687), painter, active in Venice after 1643
- Bernardino Licinio (c. 1489–1565), painter of Venice and Lombardy
- Pietro Lombardo (1435–1515), architect and sculptor, active in Venice
- Baldassare Longhena (1598–1682), architect, born and worked in Venice
- Pietro Longhi (1701/2–1785), painter, born in Venice
- Lorenzo Lotto (c. 1480–1556/7), painter of the Venetian school
- Lorenzo Veneziano (fl. 1356–1372), painter
- Jan Lys (1590 or 1597–1629/1630), German painter active mainly in Venice

== M ==
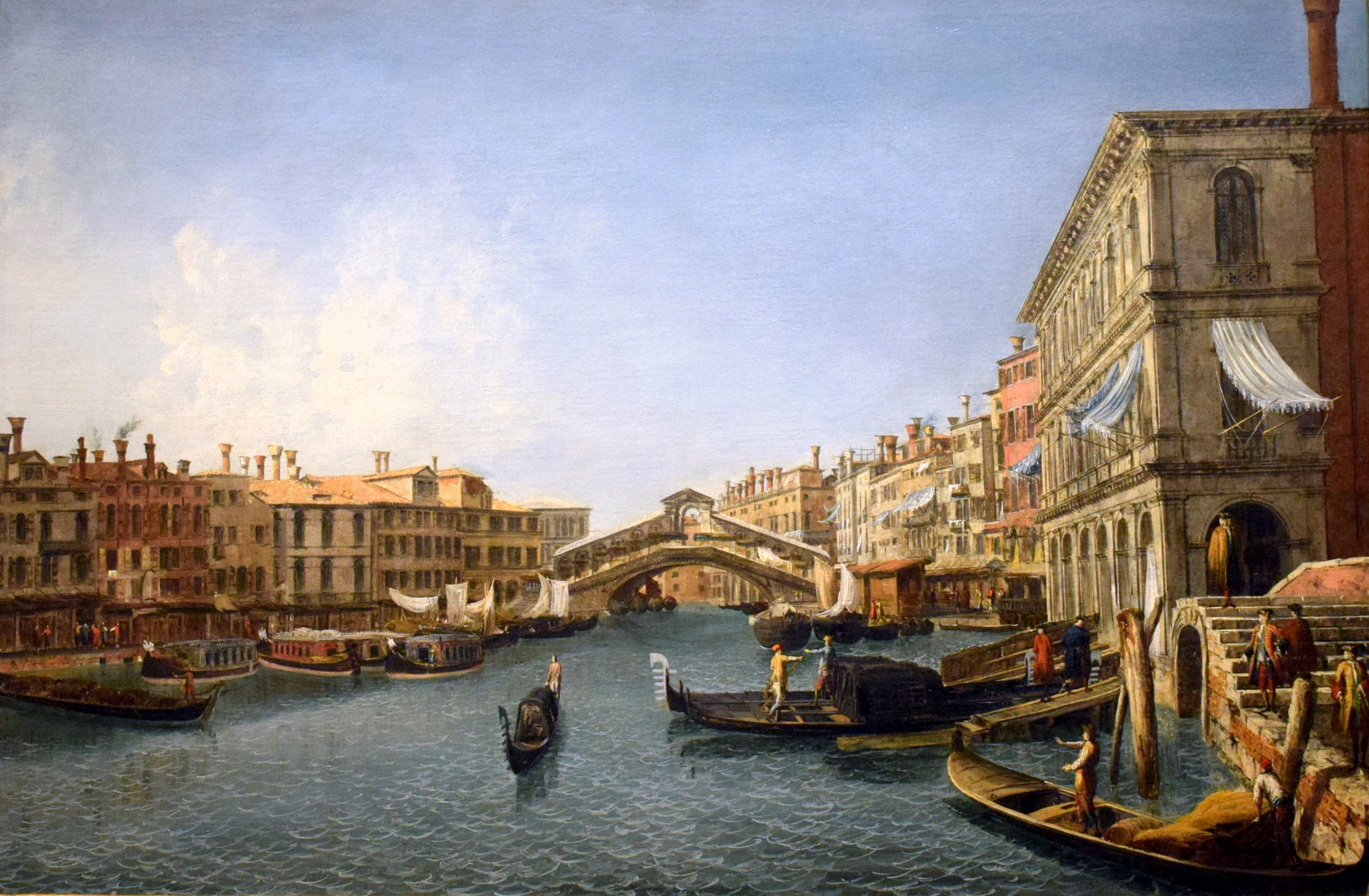
Michele Marieschi, View of the Grand Canal with Riva del Vin and Riva del Carbon

- Francesco Maffei (1605–1660), painter
- Pietro Malombra (1556–1618), painter
- Giovanni Mansueti (1465–1527), painter
- Andrea Mantegna (1431–1506), painter, engraver and student of archaeology
- Michele Marieschi (1710–1744), painter of landscapes and vedute
- Jacobello dalle Masegne (Venezia, 1350–c. 1409)
- Pierpaolo dalle Masegne (active c. 1380–c. 1410), architect
- Giorgio Massari (1687–1766), architect
- Sebastiano Mazzoni (1611–1678), painter
- Andrea Meldolla (c. 1510/15–1563), painter and etcher
- Arrigo Meyring (1628–1723), German sculptor, active in Venice
- Michelino da Besozzo (c. 1370–c. 1455), painter and manuscript illuminator
- Andrea Michieli (c. 1542–1617), painter
- Bartolomeo Montagna (1450–1523), painter and architect
- Francesco Montemezzano (c. 1540–after 1602), painter of the late-Renaissance or Mannerist period
- Alessandro Moretto (c. 1498–1554), painter; more commonly known as "Moretto da Brescia"
- Johann Maria Morlaiter (1699–1781), sculptor
- Andrea da Murano (active 1463–1502), painter

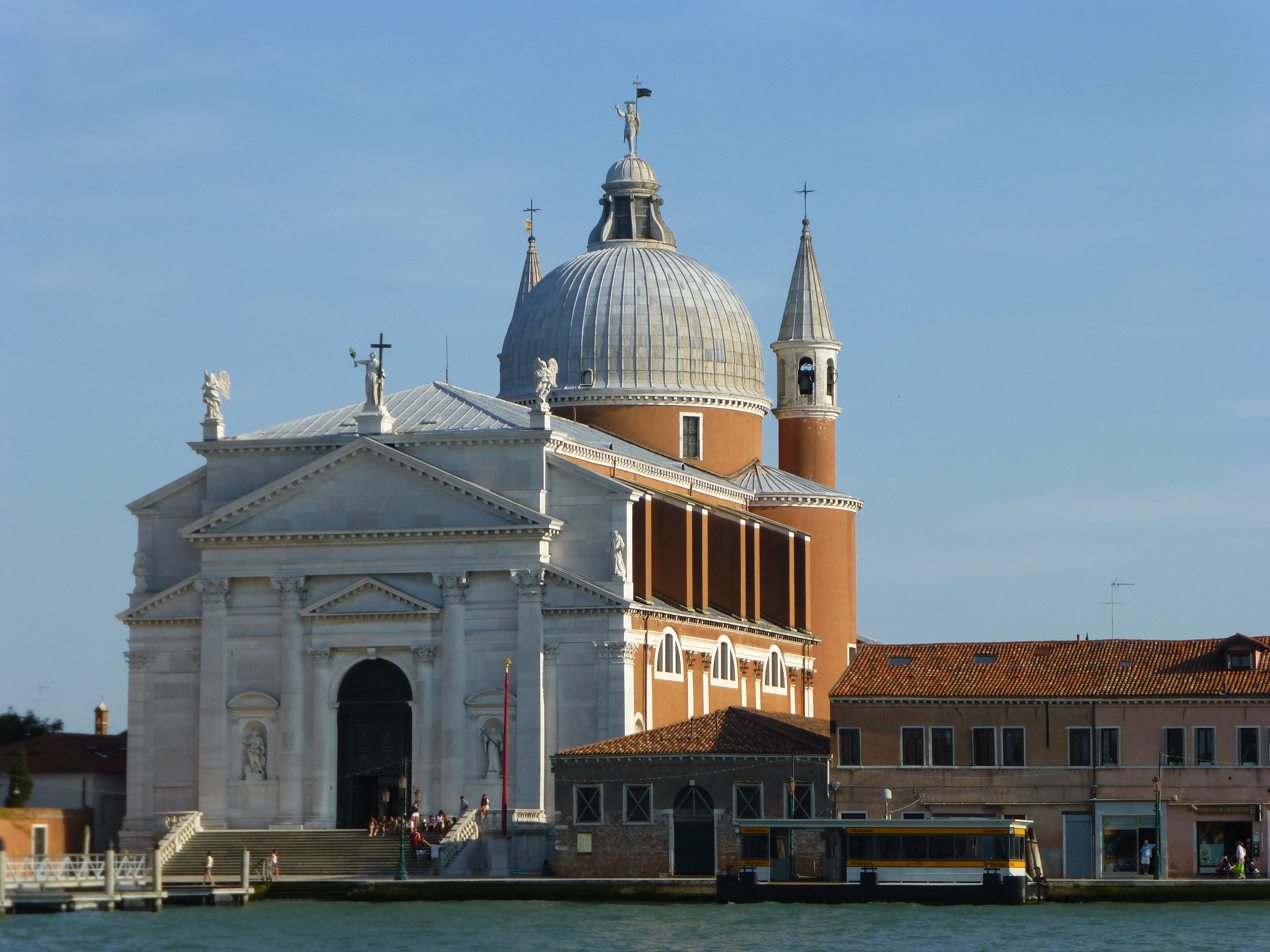
Andrea Palladio, Il Redentore

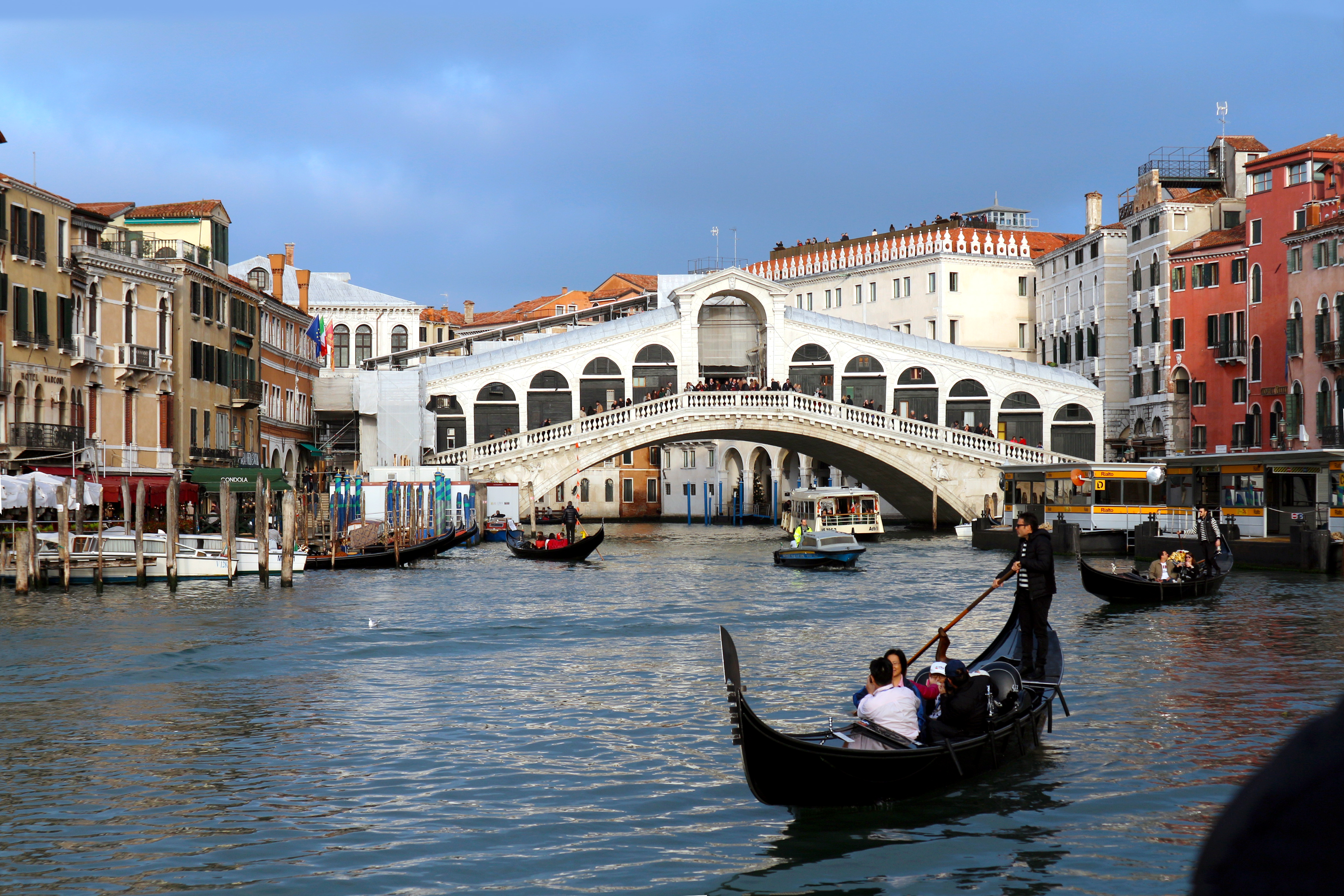
The present Rialto Bridge, by Antonio da Ponte

== P ==
- Andrea Palladio (1508–1580), one of the world's major architects
- Palma the Elder (c. 1480–1528), painter
- Palma the Younger (1548/50–1628), painter, follower of Tintoretto
- Veneziano Paolo (before 1333–after 1358), painter
- Giovanni Antonio Pellegrini (1675–1741), decorative painter, best known for his work in England
- Ugo Pendini (1853–1895), painter
- Pier Maria Pennacchi (1464–before 1515), painter
- Santo Peranda (1566–1638), painter
- Giovanni Battista Piazzetta (1682–1754), painter, first director of the Accademia di Belle Arti di Venezia
- Bonifacio Pitati (1487–1553), painter, also known as "Bonifazio Veronese"
- Giambattista Pittoni (1687–1767), painter
- Antonio da Ponte (1512–1595), Swiss-born architect and engineer, best known for rebuilding the Rialto Bridge
- Il Pordenone (c. 1484–1539), painter, real name "Giovanni Antonio de' Sacchis"
- Giuseppe Porta (1520–1575), painter

== R ==
- Nicolas Régnier (1591–1667), Flemish painter who worked and died in Venice
- Pietro Ricchi (1606–1675), painter
- Marco Ricci (1676–1730), painter who worked in England with Pellegrini
- Sebastiano Ricci (1659–1734), painter who also worked in London, Paris, Florence and Turin
- Niccolò Roccatagliata (1593–1636), sculptor
- Girolamo Romani (c. 1485–c. 1566), painter
- Johann Rottenhammer (1564–1625), German painter who worked in Venice from 1595–1606; known for his cabinet paintings

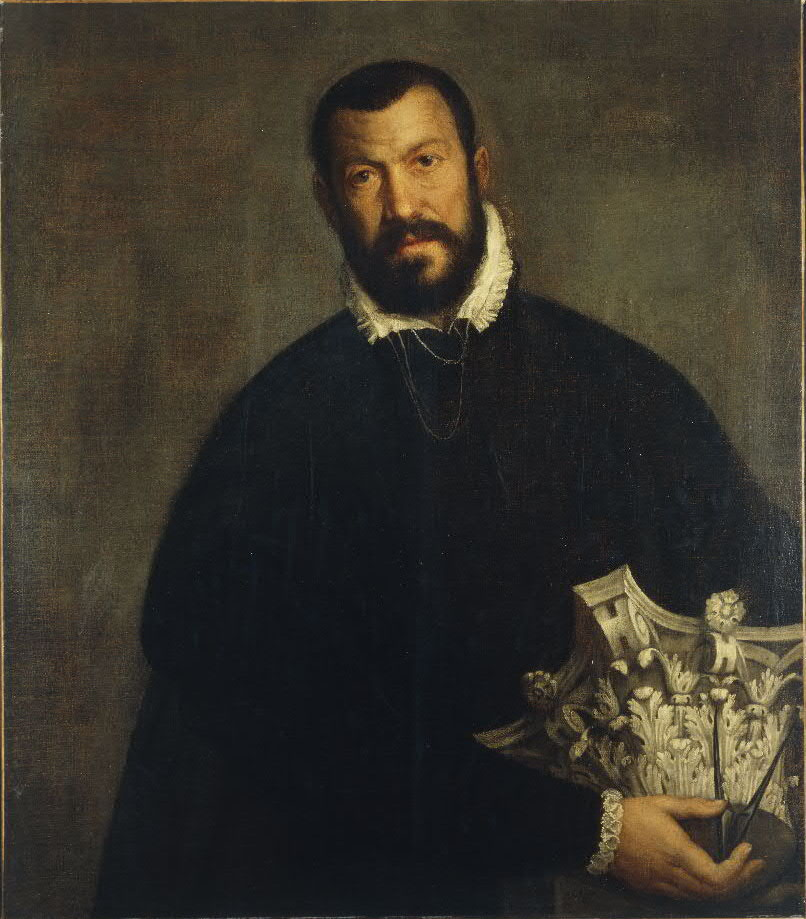
Vincenzo Scamozzi, by Paolo Veronese

== S ==
- Michele Sanmicheli (1484–1559), architect and urban planner
- Jacopo Sansovino (1486–1570), sculptor and chief architect for the Procurators of San Marco
- Girolamo da Santacroce (c. 1480/85–c. 1556), painter
- Carlo Saraceni (1579–1620), painter, spent most of his working life in Rome
- Girolamo Savoldo (c. 1480/85–after 1548), painter
- Giovanni Scalfurotto (c. 1700–1764), architect
- Vincenzo Scamozzi (1548–1616), architect; author of The Idea of a Universal Architecture
- Sebastiano del Piombo (c. 1485–1547), real name "Sebastiano Luciani", painter who became an assistant to Pope Clement VII (keeper of the leaden seal, hence "Piombo", which means "lead")
- Gian Antonio Selva (1751–1819), architect
- Bernardo Strozzi (c. 1581–1644), painter
- Lambert Sustris (c. 1515–1520–c. 1584), painter of Dutch origin active mainly in Venice

== T ==
- Tommaso Temanza (1705–1789), architect and writer of biographies
- Giambattista Tiepolo (1696–1770), painter and printmaker who also worked in Germany and Spain
- Giandomenico Tiepolo (1727–1804), painter and printmaker; son of the above
- Domenico Tintoretto (1560–1635), painter, son of Jacopo Tintoretto
- Jacopo Tintoretto (1518–1594), one of the world's major painters
- Andrea Tirali (1657–1737), architect
- Titian (c. 1488/90–1576), real name "Tiziano Vecelli"; one of the world's major painters

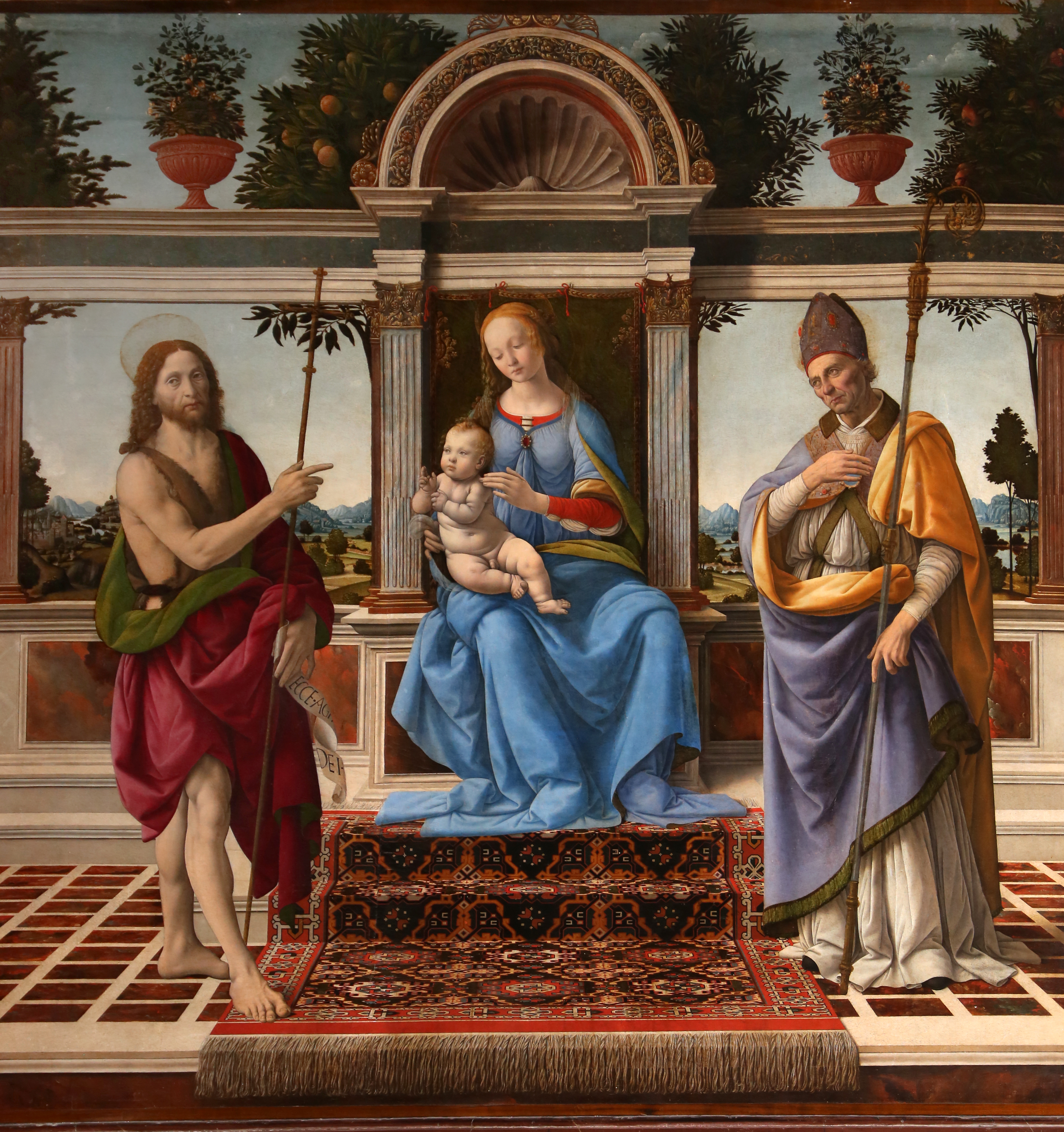
Andrea Verrocchio, Madonna with Sts John the Baptist and Donatus

== V ==
- Alessandro Varotari (1588–1649), commonly known as "Padovanino", painter
- Antonio Vassilacchi (1556–1629), painter of Greek parentage, known for his decorations in the Doge's Palace
- Pietro della Vecchia (1603–1678), real name "Pietro Muttoni", painter
- Paolo Veronese (1528–1588), one of the world's major painters, known for scenes from history and mythology
- Andrea del Verrocchio (c. 1435–1488), real name "Andrea di Michele di Francesco de' Cioni", painter, sculptor and goldsmith
- Antonio Visentini (1688–1782), architectural designer, painter and engraver
- Alessandro Vittoria (1525–1608), sculptor
- Alvise Vivarini (c. 1442/53–c. 1503/05), painter
- Antonio Vivarini (fl. 1440–1480), painter, father of the Alvise Vivarini
- Bartolomeo Vivarini (c. 1432–c. 1499), painter, brother of Antonio Vivarini

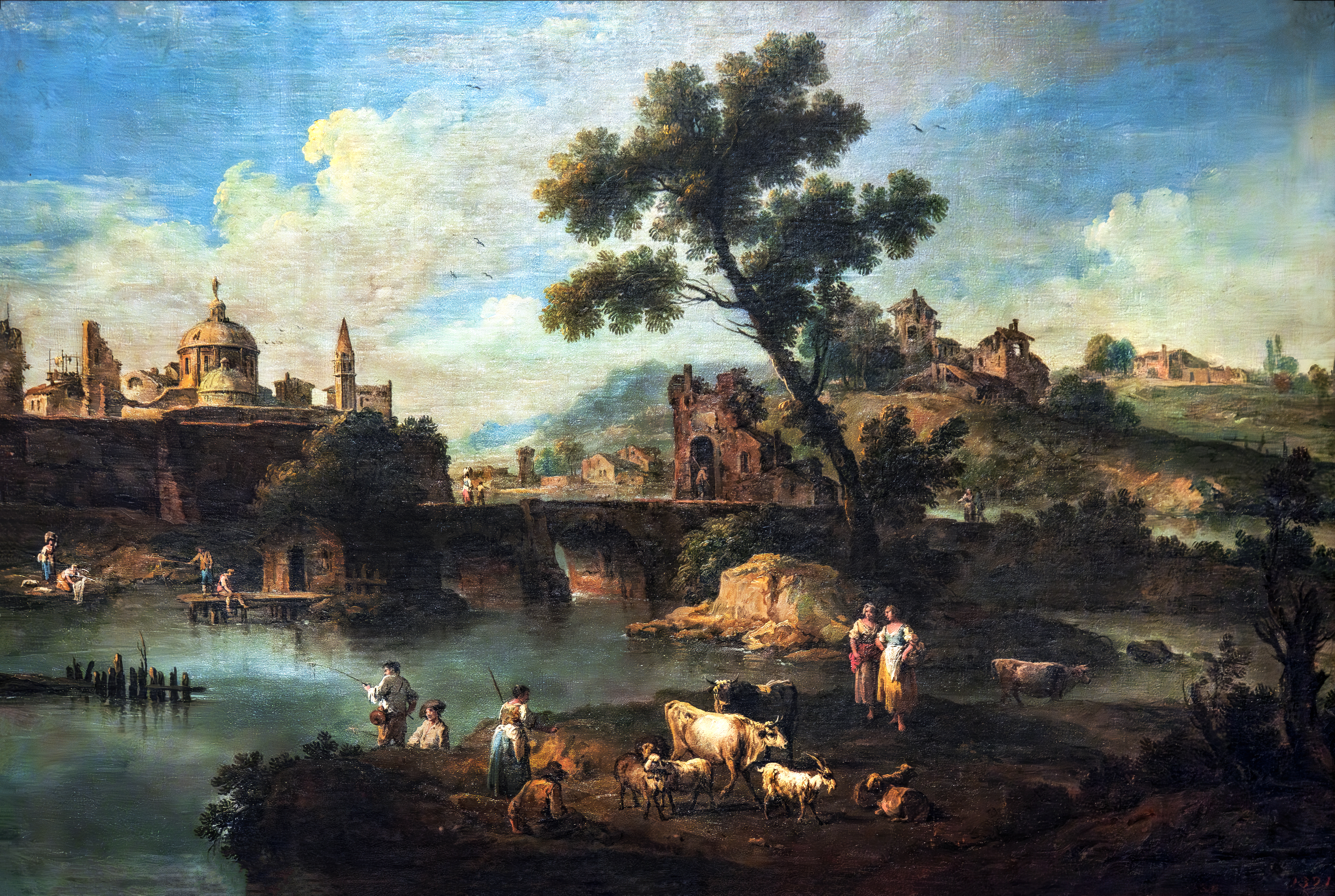
Giuseppe Zais, Landscape with River and Bridge

== Z ==
- Giuseppe Zais (1709–1784), painter
- Antonio Zanchi (1631–1722), painter
- Francesco Zuccarelli (1702–1788), painter; native to Bologna, he served as President of the Accademia di Belle Arti di Venezia and later lived in Florence
- Federico Zuccari (c. 1540/41–1609), painter; spent much of his working life in Rome and abroad
