= Punta della Dogana =

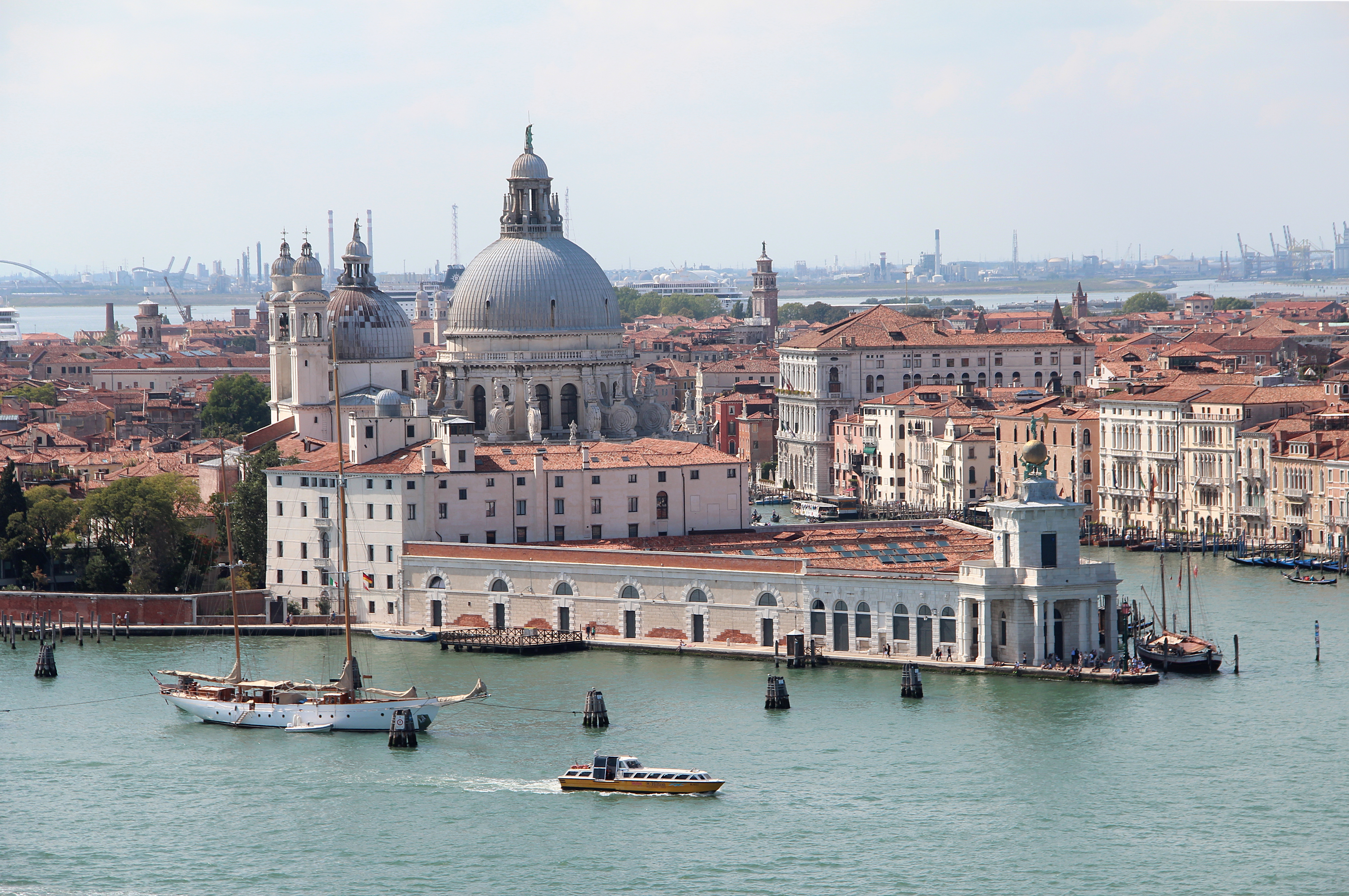
- View of Punta della Dogana (center) in 2005, with lamppost at triangular tip
- Click the map for an interactive, fullscreen view
- Established: 6 June 2009
- Location: Venice, Italy
- Coordinates: 45.431°N 12.336°E
- Type: Art museum
- Owner: City of Venice
- Website: www.palazzograssi.it/en

Punta della Dogana is an art museum in one of Venice's old customs buildings, the Dogana da Mar. It also refers to the triangular area of Venice where the Grand Canal meets the Giudecca Canal, and its collection of buildings: the church of Santa Maria della Salute, (hence the area is also known as Punta della Salute), the Patriarchal Seminary of Venice, and Dogana da Mar at the triangle's tip.

== Geography and history ==
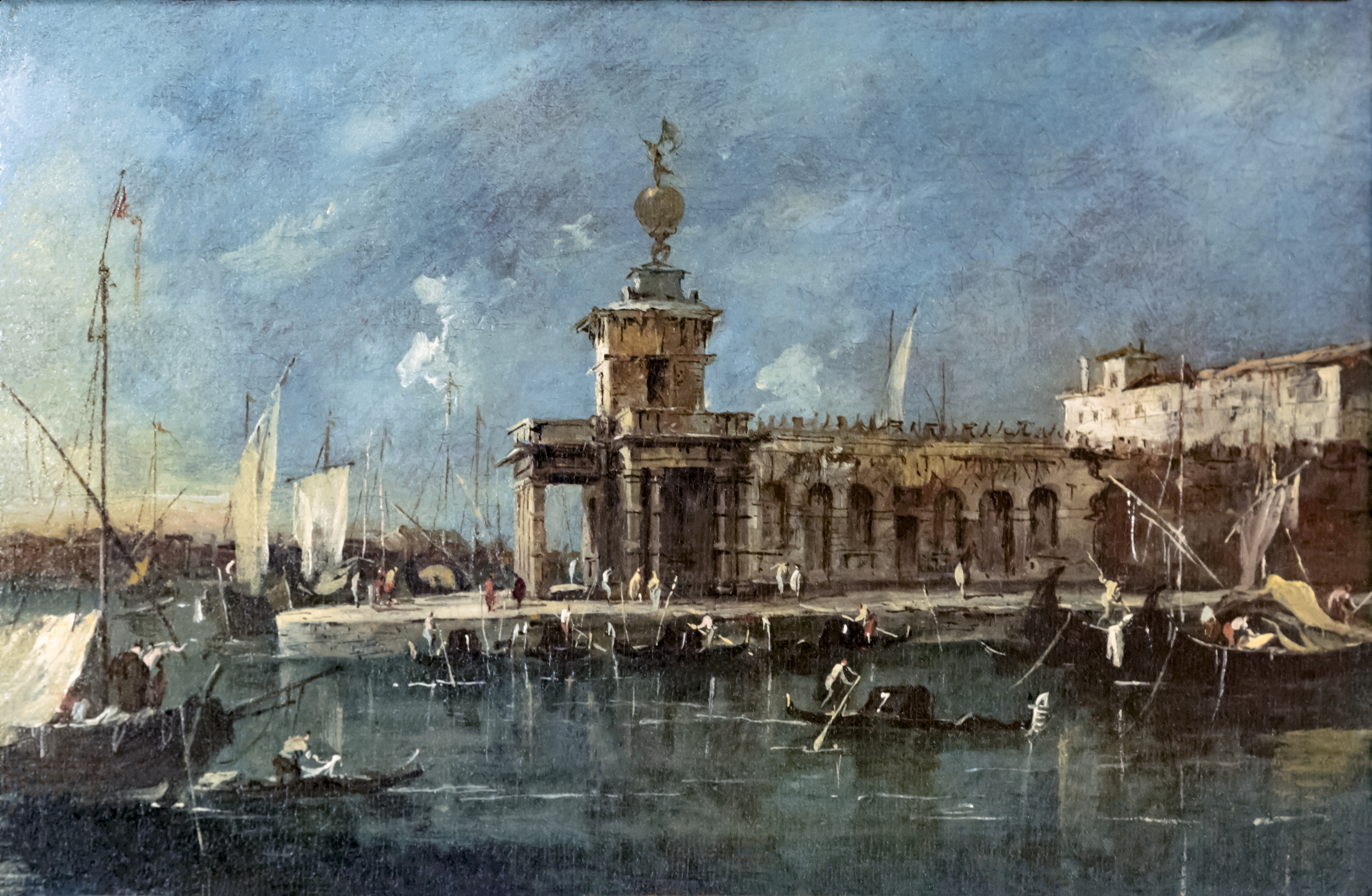
View of Punta della Dogana by Francesco Guardi, c. 1765

Punta della Dogana is located between the Grand and Giudecca Canals at the tip of an island in the Dorsoduro district. Adjacent to each other are the Dogana da Mar, Patriarchal Seminary, and Santa Maria della Salute. It is diagonal from the Piazza San Marco.

The point was used for docking and customs as early as the beginning of the 15th century. The temporary structures built to store merchandise and customs workers were replaced by the Punta della Dogana, whose construction began in 1677.

== Dogana da Mar ==
The museum's art is housed in and around the Dogana da Mar building. It was built between 1678 and 1682 as a customs house by Giuseppe Benoni. The arcade styles reflect their construction in different eras. Atop the building are two statues of Atlas holding a golden globe upon which the figure of Fortune stands. The 17th-century statue turns in the wind. The group was built by Bernardo Falconi to represent the supremacy of the Republic of Venice. The last renovation of the building was done by Alvise Pigazzi in 1838.

=== Restoration ===
The building was restored by Tadao Ando from January 2008 to March 2009, funded by François Pinault, a French billionaire and art collector. He signed a 33-year agreement with the city. The building had been empty for decades prior, with failed plans to turn it into apartments or a hotel. Dogana da Mar's stuccoed brick exterior was restored without additions, and is the only part of the original structure left intact. Cosmetic imperfections and the stucco were repaired, and bad areas were reinforced with stainless steel anchors, but areas with visible brick were left exposed. The interiors were left bare without surface treatment, and bricks were replaced sparingly. The room partitions from the last two centuries were replaced with parallel, rectangular halls. The roof was replaced by a similar roof with timber gables, with added skylights. The new floors are made of exposed and polished concrete, in some places covered with linoleum. Frank Peter Jäger called these smooth surfaces Ando's trademark, along with glass and steel fixtures that clash with the raw irregularities of the unfinished walls. He added that, for Ando, this combination "symbolizes the union of past, present, and future", the building, his architecture, and the art within it, respectively. Ando wanted to make the western entrance's face out of concrete slabs, but the change was opposed by the city. Exibart's Jacqueline Ceresoli described the building as having "industrial and minimalist soul" with red brick walls. The renovation cost was €20,000,000.

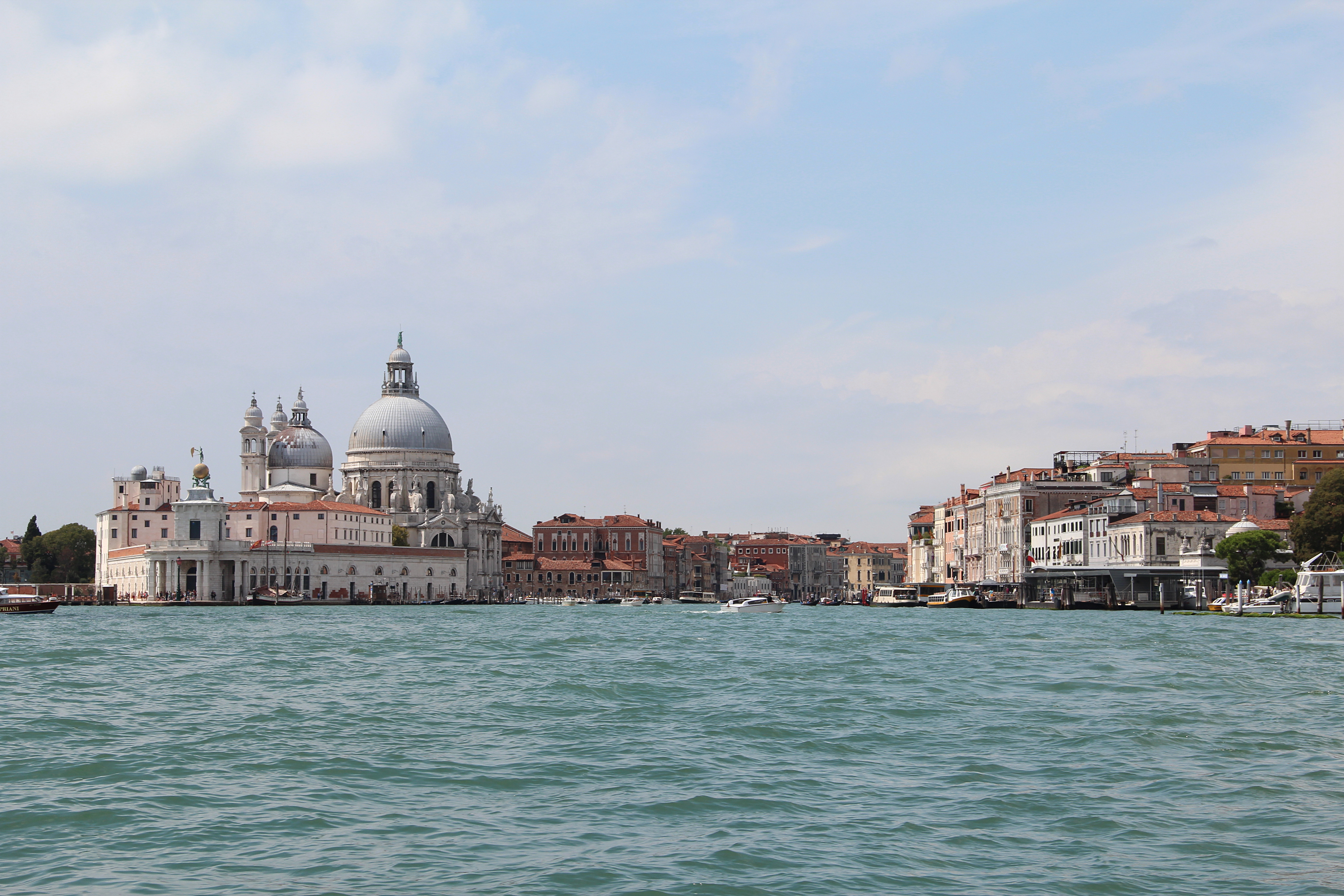
View of Punta della Dogana and Canal Grande from the Bacino di San Marco.

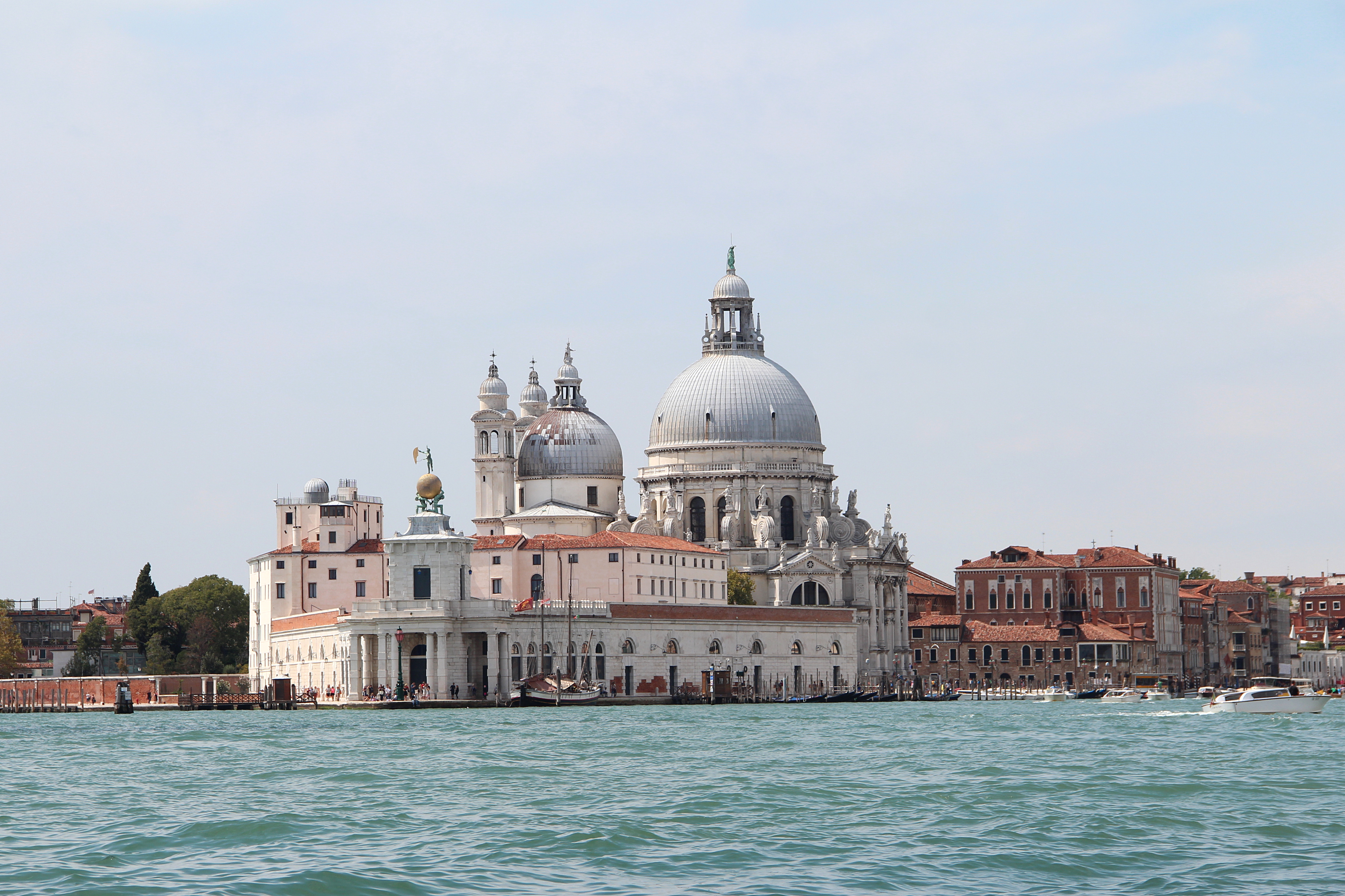
View of Punta della Dogana from the Bacino di San Marco.

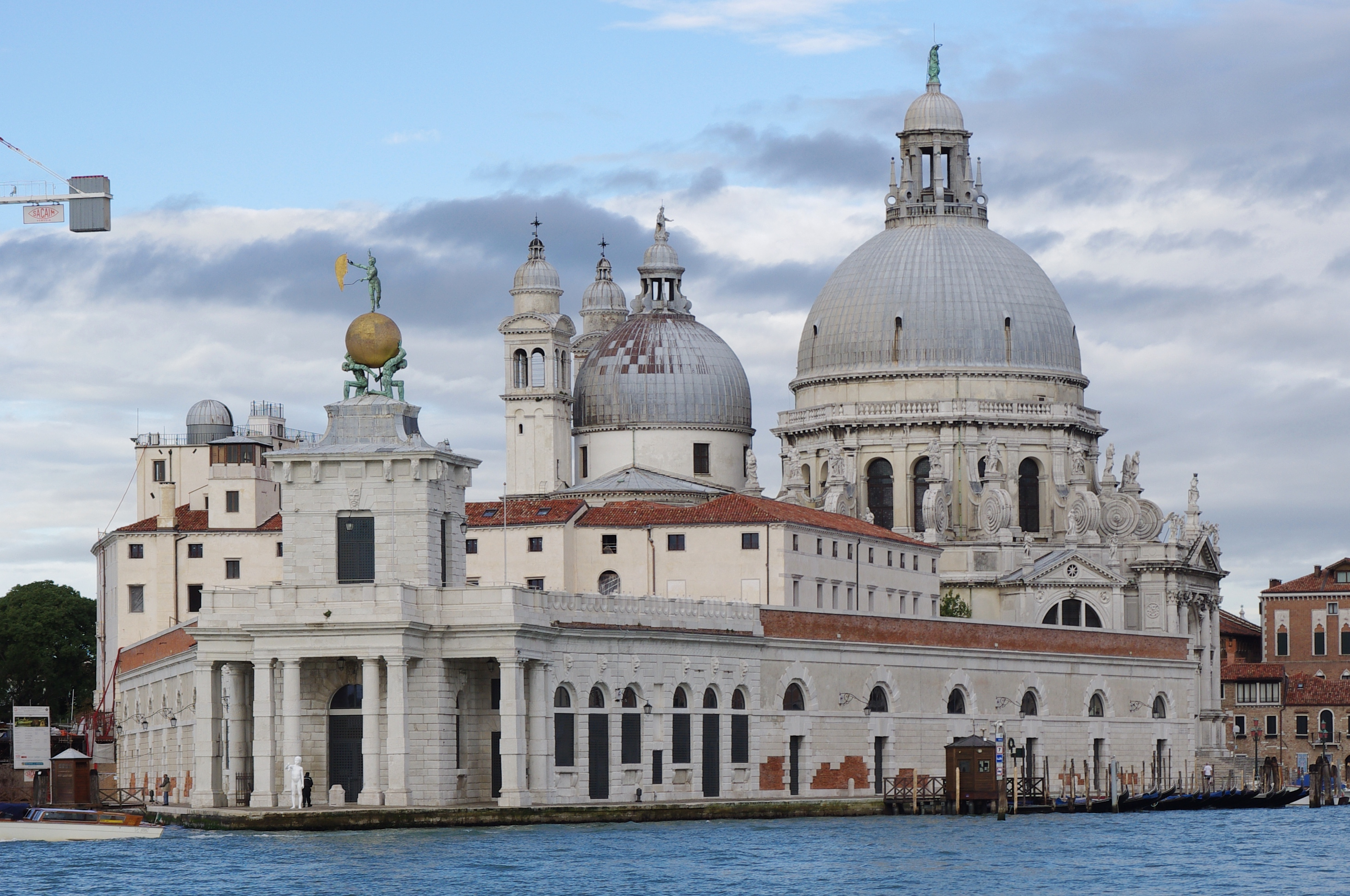
View of Punta della Dogana, facing northwest.

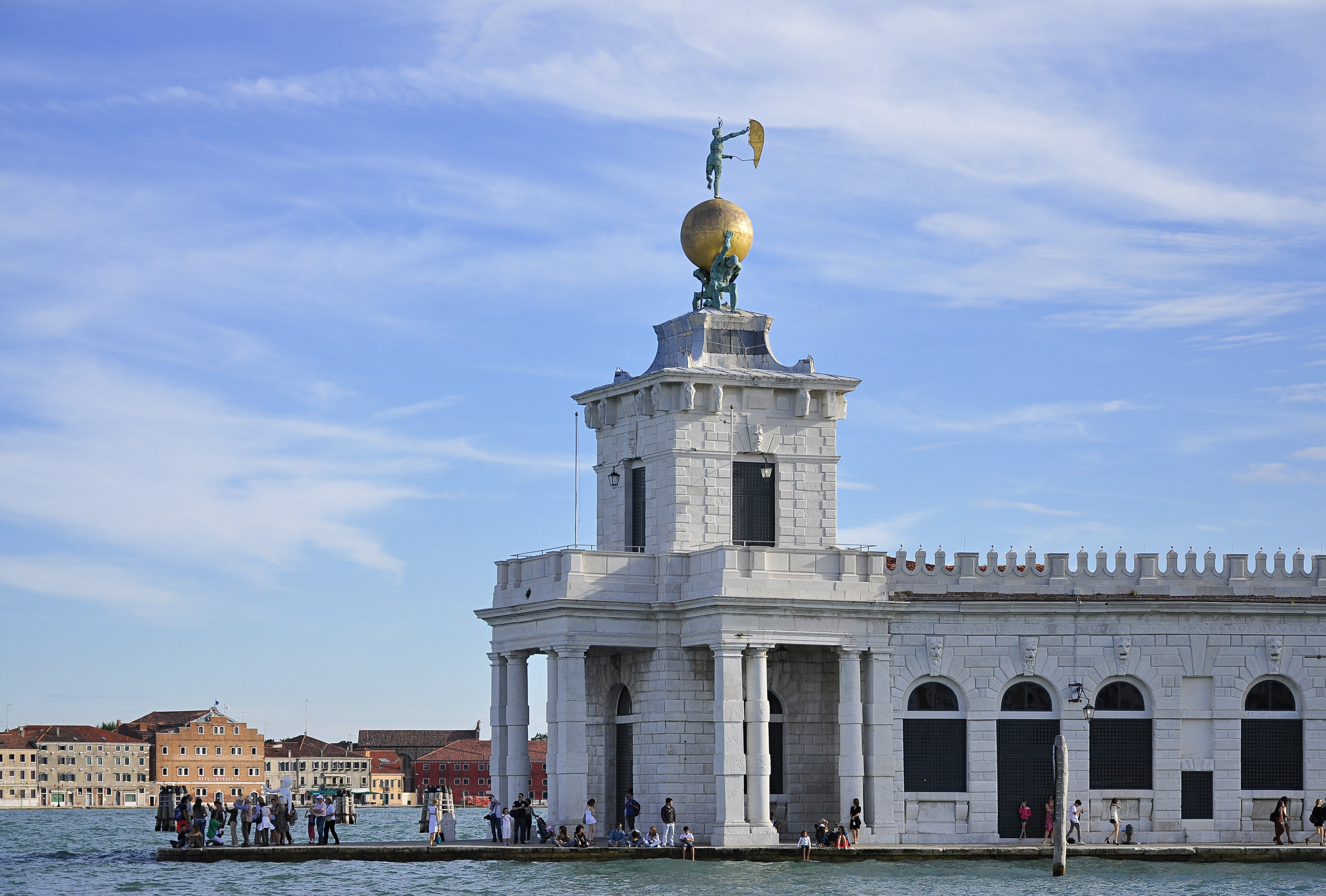
Close-up of tip of Punta della Dogana, where Dogana da Mar, the Grand Canale, and the Giudecca Canal touch..

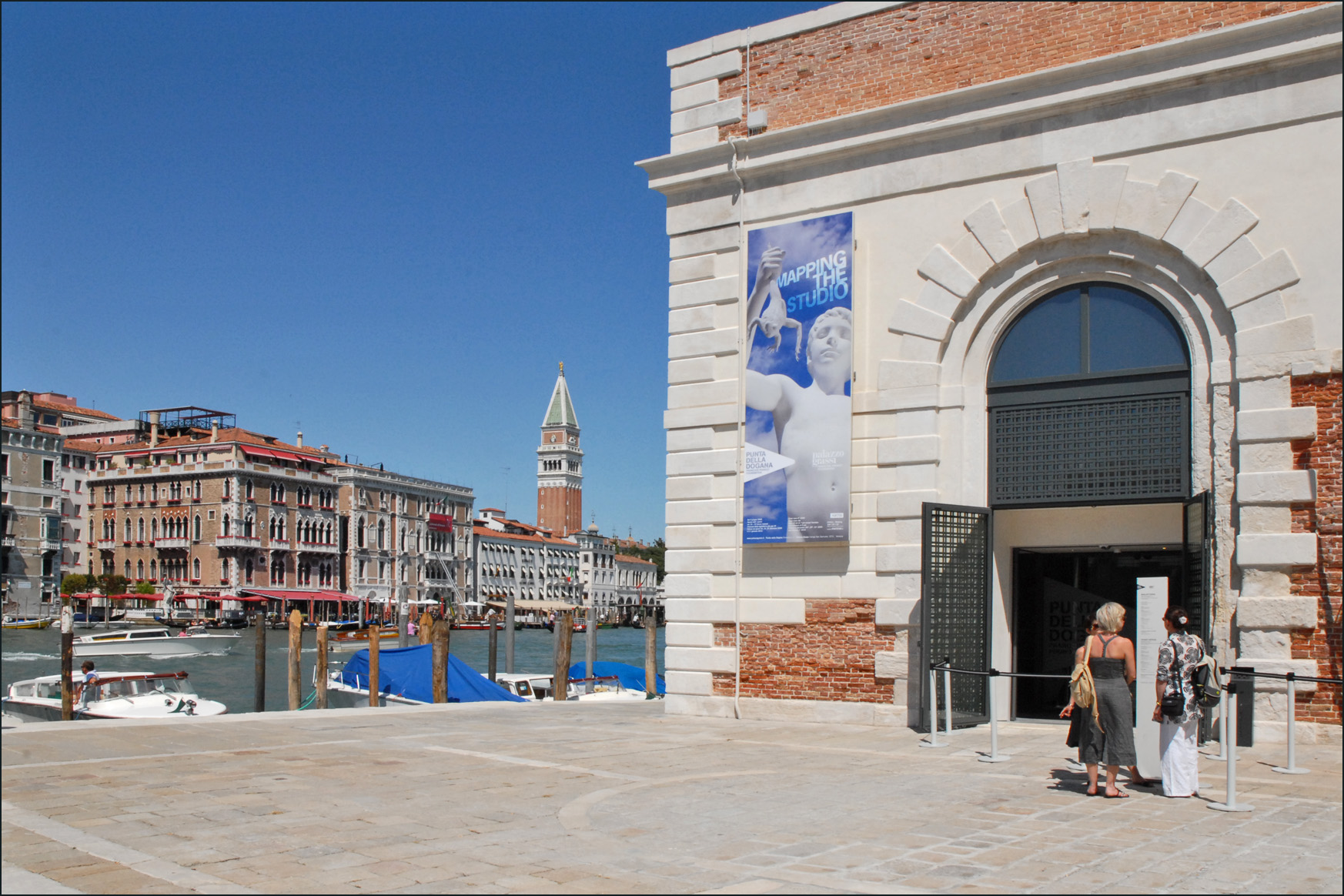
Entrance of museum.

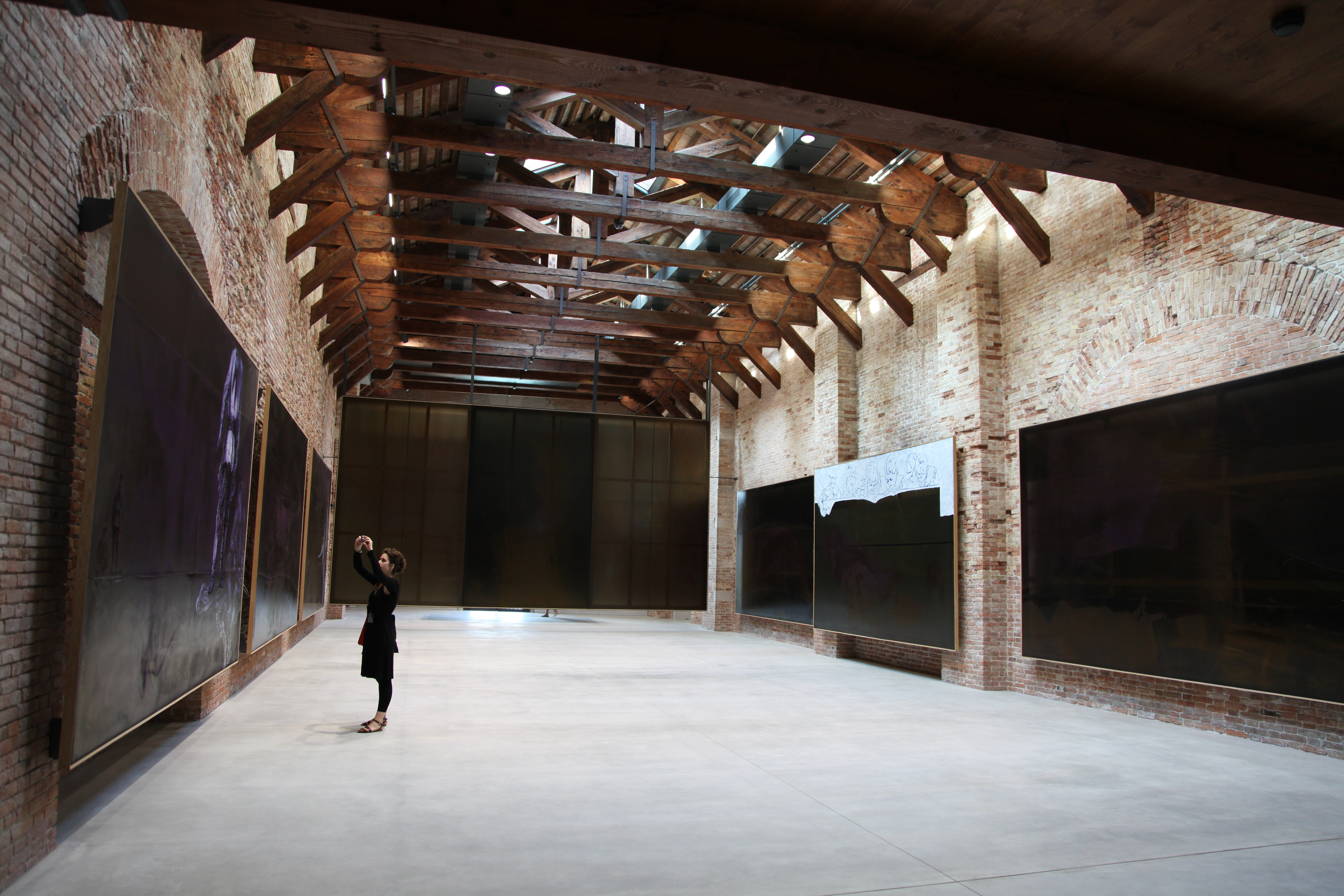
Inside of Punta della Dogana after renovation.

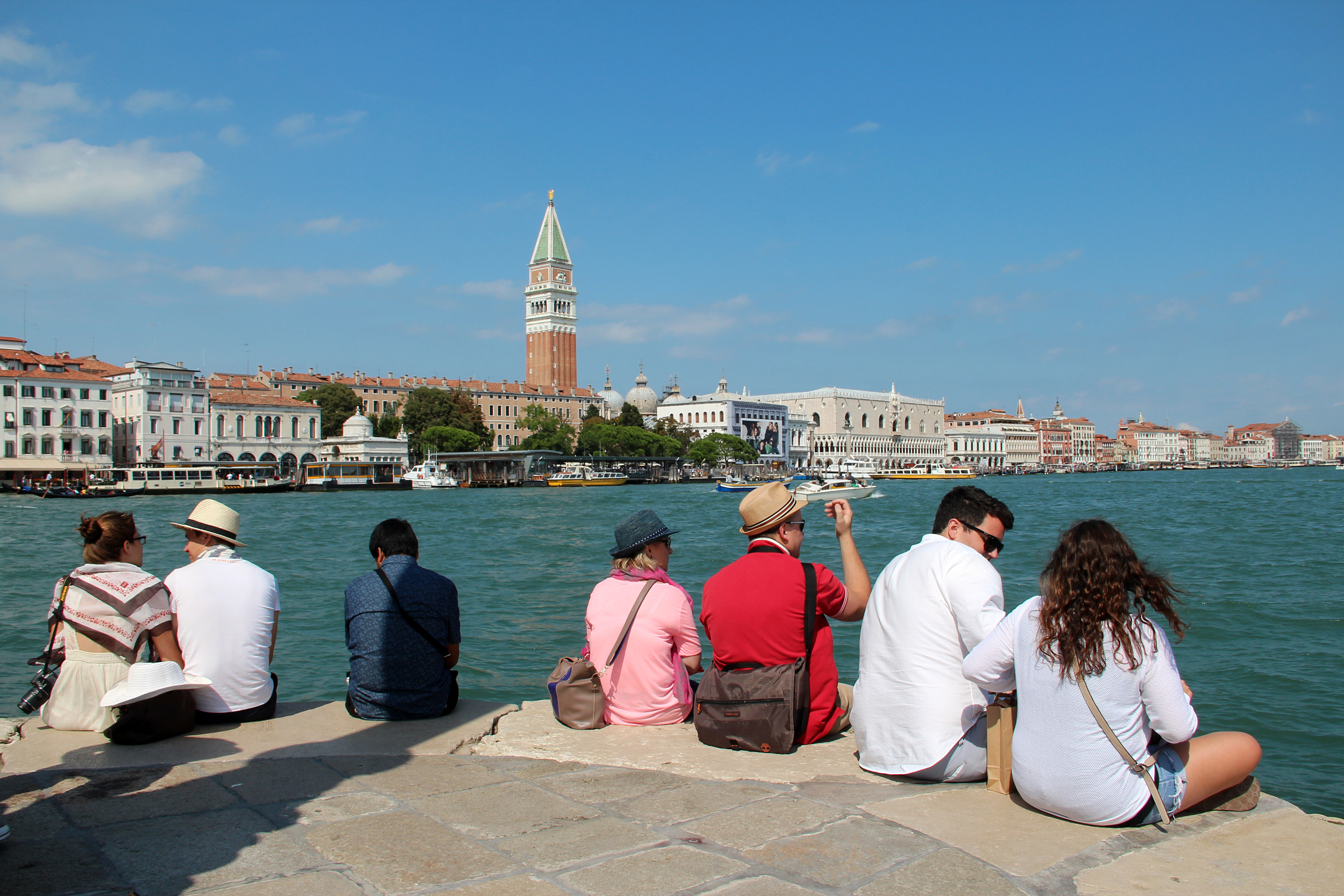
View of San Marco from the Punta della Dogana.

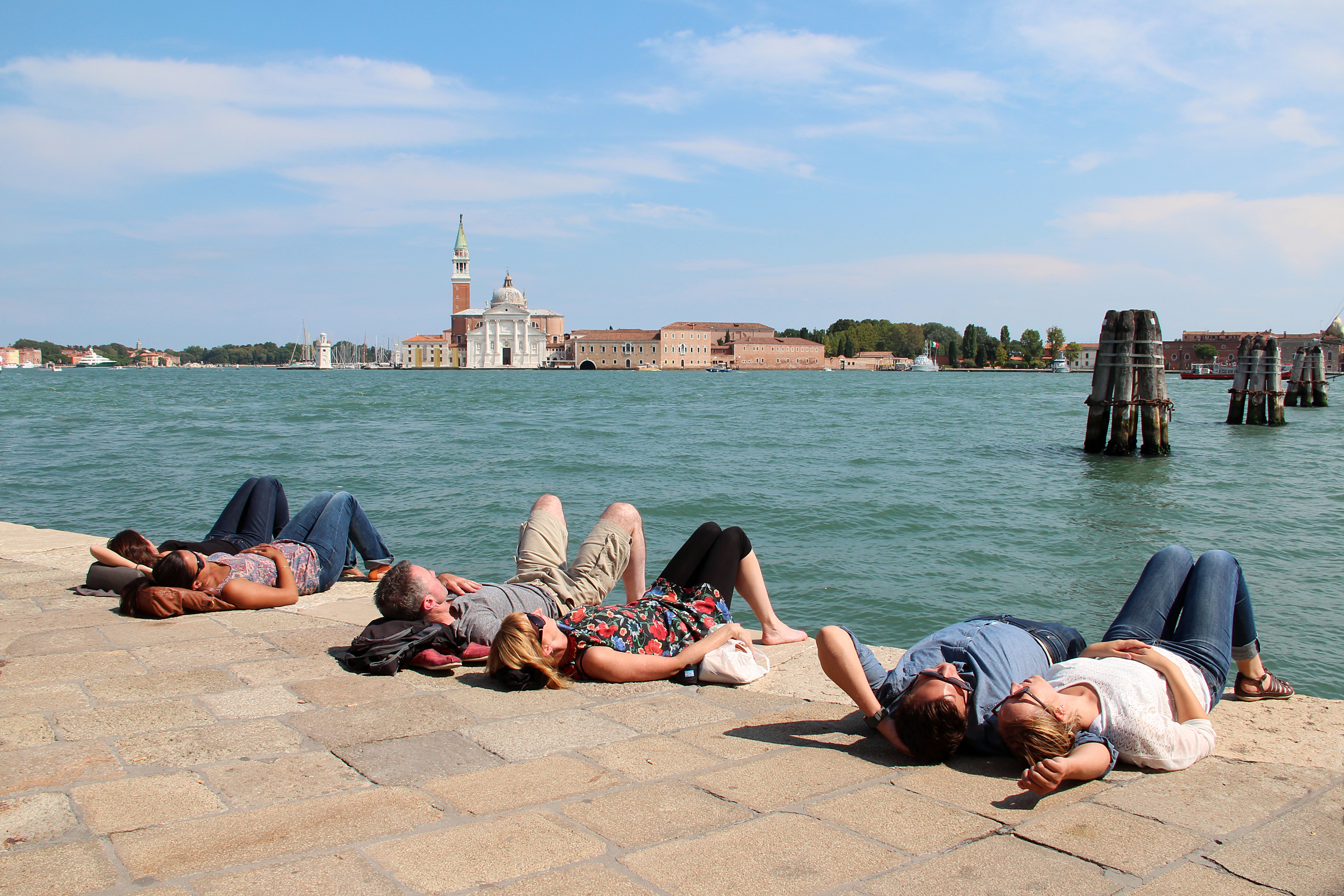
View of San Giorgio Maggiore from the Punta della Dogana.

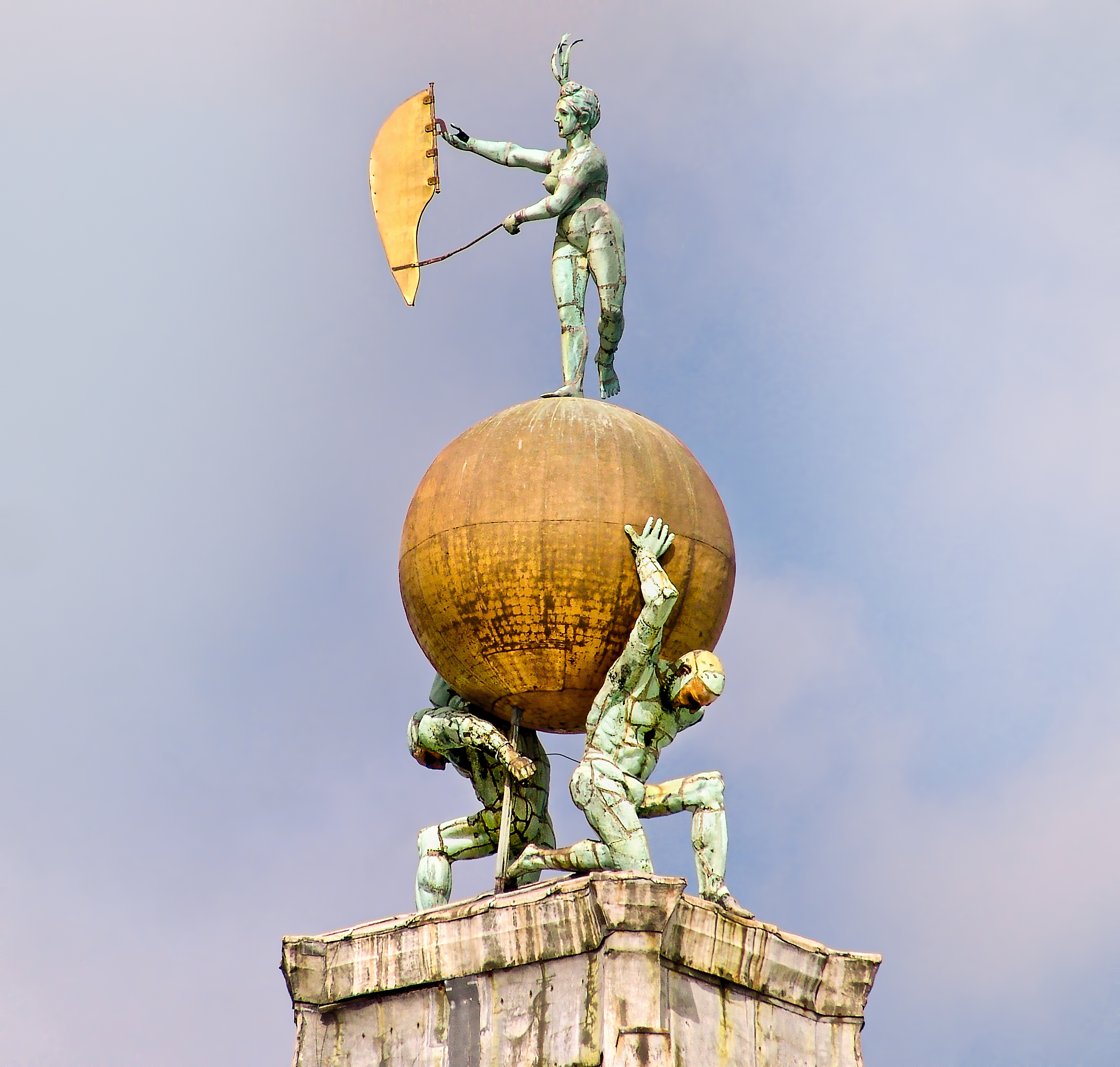
Sculpture atop the Dogana building.

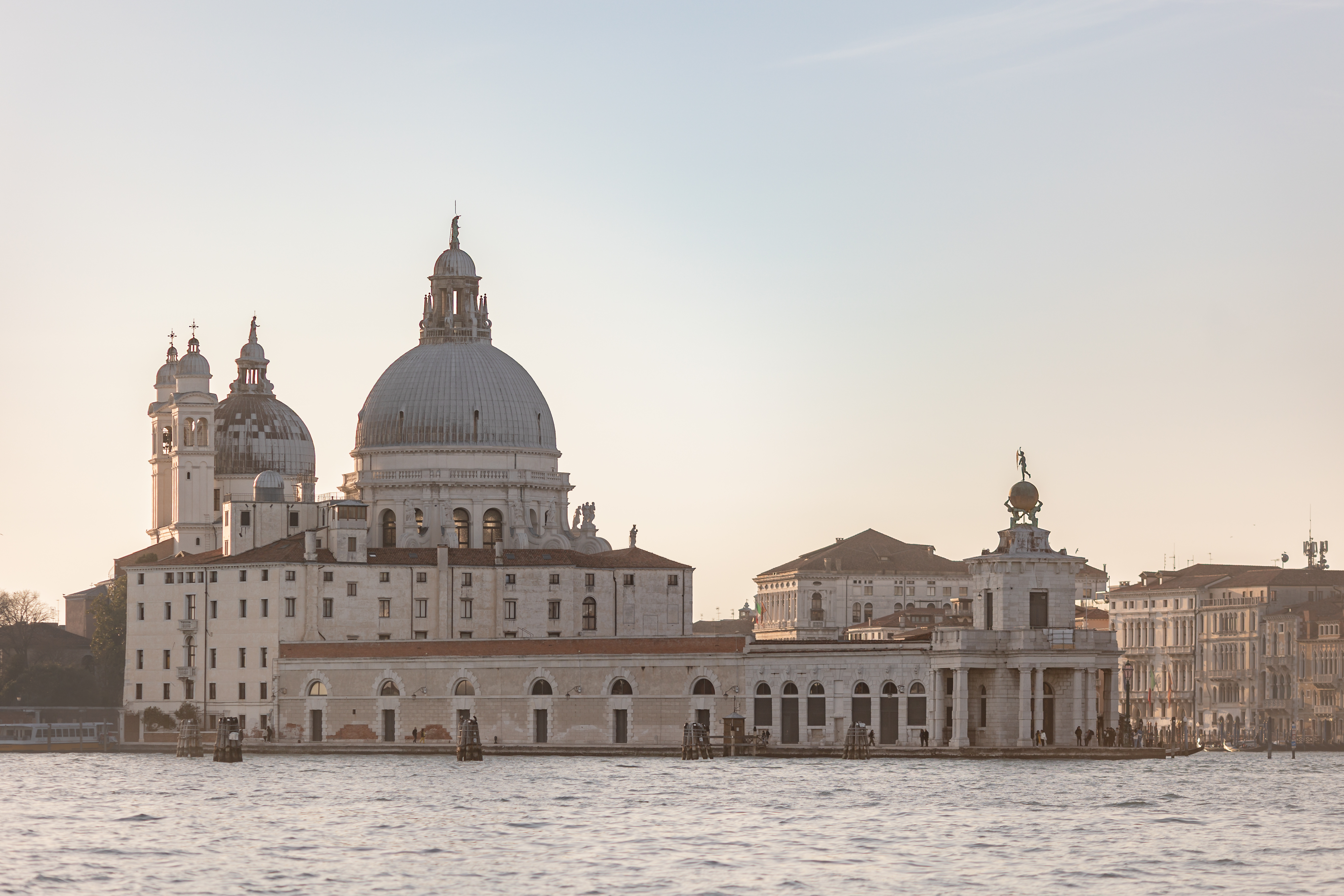
Punta Della Dogana seen from San Giorgio Maggiore Island.

== Exhibitions ==
In June 2009, Punta della Dogana reopened to the public and since then has been presenting temporary exhibitions of the Pinault Collection:

- Mapping the Studio: Artists from the François Pinault Collection, curated by Francesco Bonami and Alison Gingeras. Presented at Punta della Dogana and Palazzo Grassi, June 2009 – April 2011
- In Praise of Doubt, curated by Caroline Bourgeois, April 2011 – March 2013
- Prima Materia, curated by Caroline Bourgeois and Michael Govan, May 2013 – February 2015
- Slip of the Tongue, curated by Danh Vo in collaboration with Caroline Bourgeois, April 2015 – January 2016
- Accrochage, curated by Caroline Bourgeois, April 2016 – November 2016
- Treasures from the Wreck of the Unbelievable. Damien Hirst, curated by Elena Geuna. Presented at Punta della Dogana and Palazzo Grassi. April 2017 – December 2017
- Dancing with Myself, curated by Martin Bethenod and Florian Ebner, April 2018 – December 2018
- Luogo e Segni, curated by Mouna Mekouar and Martin Bethenod, March 2019 – December 2019
- Untitled 2020. Three Perspectives on The Art of The Present, curated by Caroline Bourgeois, Muna El Fituri and Thomas Houseago, July - November 2020
- Bruce Nauman: Contrapposto Studies, curated by Carlos Basualdo and Caroline Bourgeois, May 2021 - November 2022

Complex's Elisa Carmichael called Punta della Dogana's Prima Materia show of about 80 works from the Pinault Collection an "absolute must-see" outside of the 2013 Venice Biennale. Exibart's Jacqueline Ceresoli had similar praise for the show.

François Pinault commissioned a statue for the tip of Punta della Dogana from Charles Ray upon receiving approval from the city to start the museum. Ray made an eight-foot-tall boy holding a frog by its leg intended as a public sculpture called Boy with Frog. The sculpture's permit was set to be negotiated four times annually. Boy with Frog was originally encased upon the museum's July 2009 opening after protests following its installation. The city moved in early 2013 to replace the statue with a reproduction of the streetlamp once situated there. Its spokesperson said that the sculpture's installation was designed to be temporary. Ray refused an offer to relocate the sculpture to Palazzo Grassi, opting to put the sculpture into storage. Independent curator Francesco Bonami wrote in La Stampa that the removal was "administrative cowardice" and the lamppost represented "cultural darkness".

== See also ==
- List of buildings and structures in Venice

Preceded by Piazza San Marco	Venice landmarks Punta della Dogana	Succeeded by Il Redentore
