= Camerlenghi di Comun =

Senior fiscal officials of the Republic of Venice

The Camerlenghi di Comun were senior fiscal officials of the Republic of Venice.

Although they are first attested in 1236, they are likely much older in origin. Originally two, they were increased to three in 1527.

Their role was as the treasurers and cashiers of the Republic: apart from those magistrates to whom specific funds were assigned, all public expenses and revenue were handled by the Camerlenghi di Comun. They were further tasked with imposing fines on debtors to the state, and proposing cost-saving measures. They were allowed to dispose of sums up to ten gold ducats. Their main residence was in the Zecca of Venice, but they also had proper offices in the Rialto, in the Palazzo dei Camerlenghi.

Initially they reported to the Doge of Venice and the Minor Council, but in 1471 they were subordinated to the board of the Savi del Consiglio.

== See also ==
- Provveditori sopra Banchi

== Sources ==
- Da Mosto, Andrea (1937). L'Archivio di Stato di Venezia. Indice Generale, Storico, Descrittivo ed Analitico. Tomo I: Archivi dell' Amministrazione Centrale della Repubblica Veneta e Archivi Notarili (in Italian). Rome: Biblioteca d'arte editrice. OCLC 772861816. Archived from the original on 2021-11-13.
