= Giuseppe Benoni =

Italian architect

Giuseppe Benoni (1618–1684) was an Italian architect, active during the Baroque period, mainly in Venice.

== Biography ==
He was born either in Udine or Trento. He worked on a number of engineering problems for the Venetian Republic. He appears to have moved to Venice at about the age of forty, and gained the title of "Proto" to the Magistrate of Water. In 1675–76, work began on renovation of the structures and decoration of the Dogana da Mar, the customs house across the canal from the Doge's palace. A Venetian council on 29 August 1676 requested proposals for refurbishing the Dogana and received designs from Benoni, Longhena, Andrea Cominelli, and Giuseppe Sardi (Venice). Only the former two designs went for further study by a committee formed by the following Procurators: Antonio Bernardo, Giovanni Battista Cornaro, Alvise Pisani, Giovanni Sagredo cavalier, Francesco Morosini cavalier, Leonardo Pesaro, Giulio Giustinian, Alvise Mocenigo IV, Silvestro Valier cavalier, and Alessandro Contarini. They ended seclecting Benoni's project, priced at 6000 ducats over Loghena's project costing twice as much.

In a publication about the project, Benoni states:

(I have arranged) it in such a way that it stands out and adorns more than the quality of the conspicuous site in which it is to be erected... in order to make the distal end similar on both sides, despite the narrowness and irregularity of the site, I procured to make it front and regular in shape, and which together shows strength and firmness. I have considered the distance and sites of all around from which to take the view, and have allowed for an eye, in all the parts that surround it, to have a variety of views to be delighted, and formed... loggias to allow comfortable and covered transit from the sides flank the canals and warehouses.

The building was built with the views of the adjacent Salute in mind. The building has a rustication appropriate for a government office, much like Jacopo Sansovino's Zecca (or mint). It is decorated by two bronze atlantes who bear a gilded sphere surmounted by the goddess Fortune holding a wind vane.

== Sources ==
- Venetian heritage entry
