= Apollonio Domenichini =

Italian painter

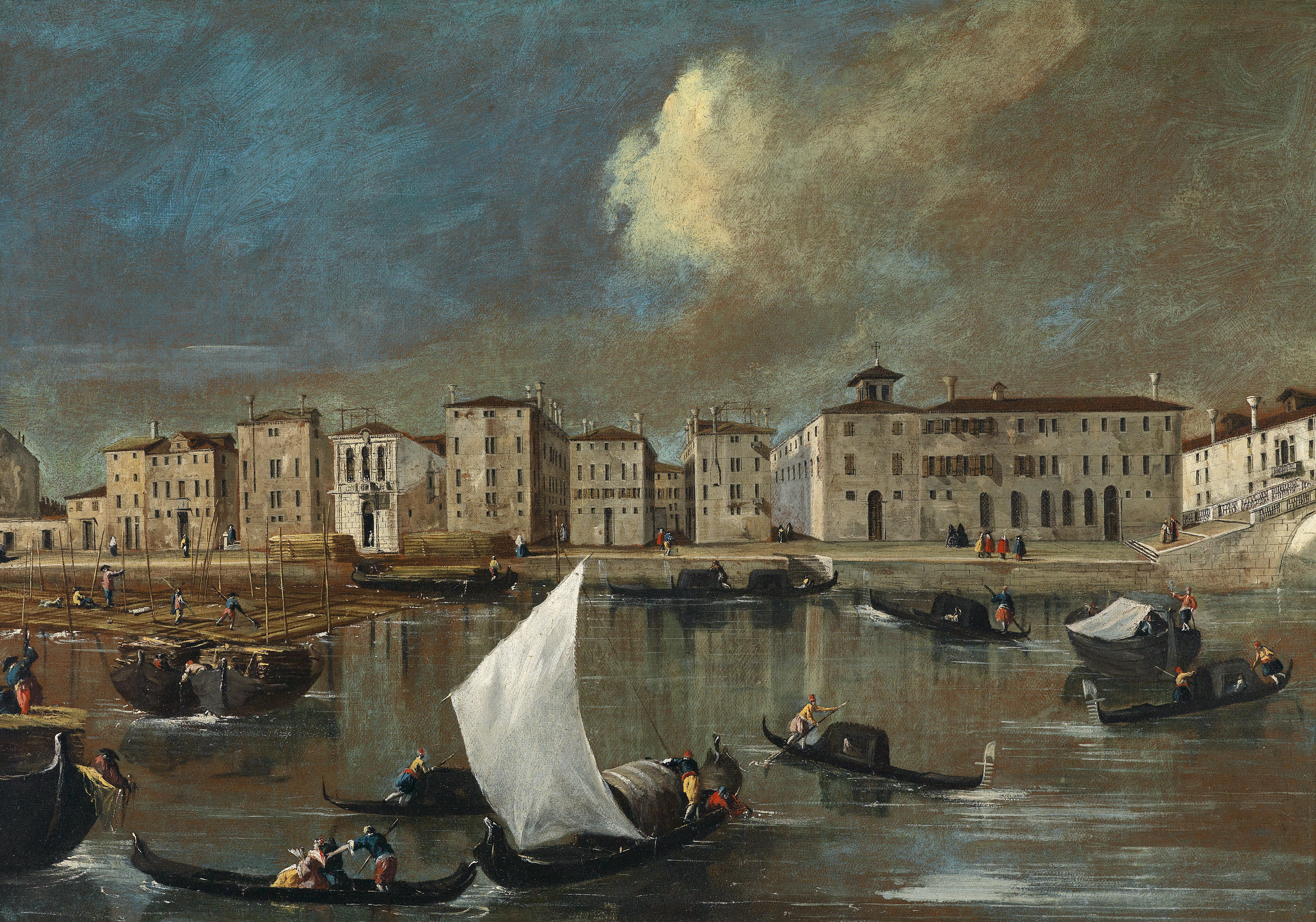
Vedute of Fondamente Nuove, Venice

Apollonio Domenichini, alternatively referred to as the Maestro della Fondazione Langmatt, or Menichini or il Menichino (Venice, 1715 - c.1770) was an Italian painter of vedute, active in Venice, Italy, between 1740 and 1770.

He was a pupil of Luca Carlevarijs and Johan Richter. He is best known for his pictorial representations of views of Venice and its surroundings. His name is recorded in the records of the fraglia or guild of Venetian painters in 1757, and it often appears as the painter of many works sent by the art dealer Giovanni Maria Sasso to the English minister John Strange in the second half of the eighteenth century. His name was proposed as the "master of the Langmatt Foundation" name from the series of thirteen vedute owned by the Langmatt Foundation in Baden near Zurich.

== Sources ==
- The information in this article is based on that in its French equivalent.
