= Ugo Pendini =

Italian painter (1853–1895)

Ugo Pendini (August 14, 1853 – 1895) was an Italian painter.

== Biography ==
While he was a resident of Messina, he was born in Venice, Austrian Empire. From 1875 to 1880, he attended the Academy of Fine Arts of Florence. He then moved to Naples, to study under Domenico Morelli at the Academy of Fine Arts, but within a year Morelli had left the academy, and Pendini returned to Florence, then Rome and Venice. He was known as portraitist and figure painter. Among his paintings were Il Giocatore exhibited at the Brera in Milan, reproduced in the Illustrazione Italiana, a journal of the publishing house of Treves. He also painted portraits of his own family, Signora Rosselli Nathan, Professor Rasi, and others. He painted picturesque vedute of the Venetian Lagoon, which were popular with English patrons.
