= Palazzo dei Camerlenghi =

Renaissance palazzo in Venice, Italy

Coordinates: 45°26′18″N 12°20′09″E

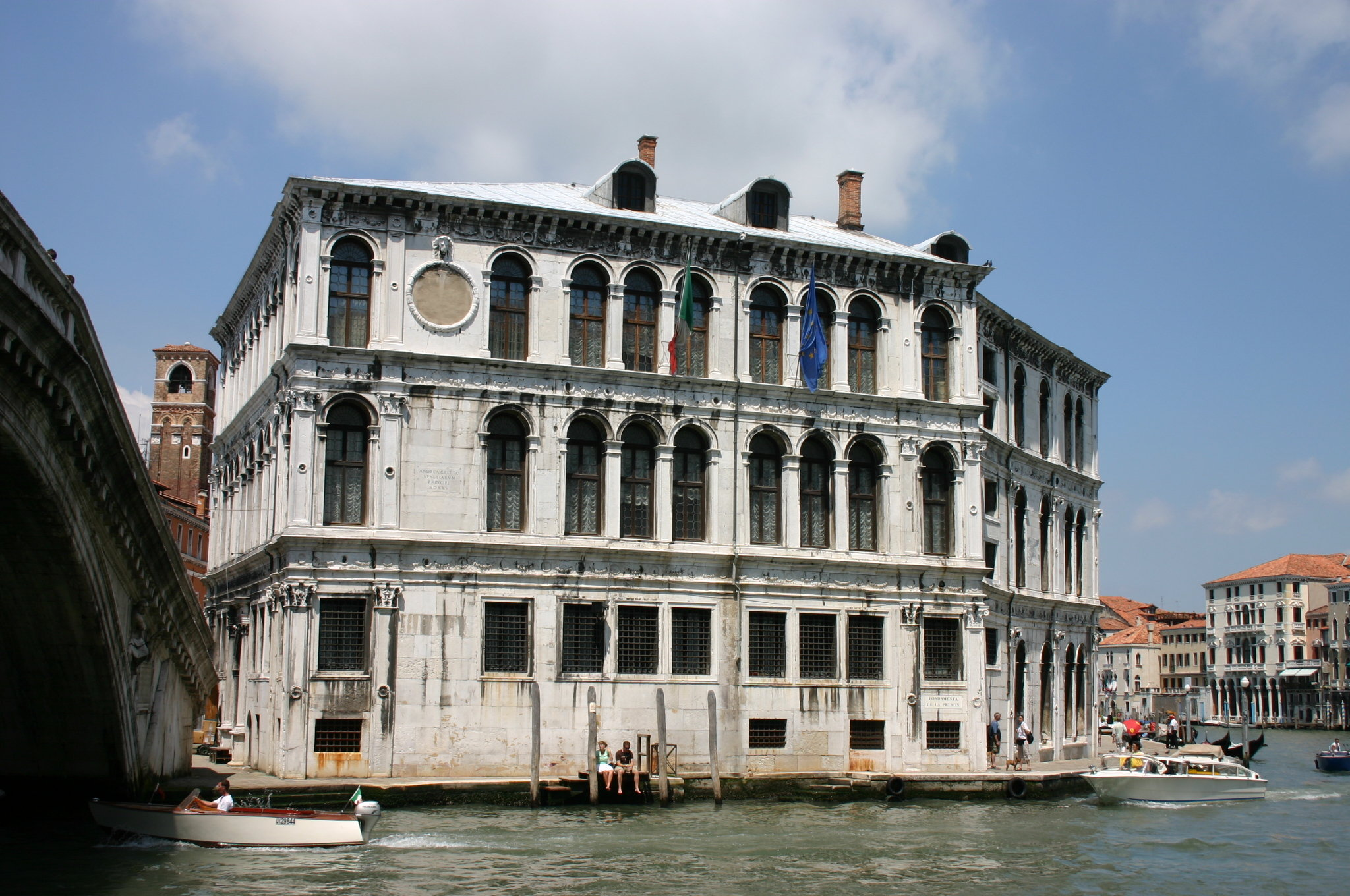
Palazzo dei Camerlenghi, with the Rialto Bridge visible on the left.

Palazzo dei Camerlenghi is a Renaissance palazzo in Venice, northern Italy, located in the sestiere (quarter) of San Polo. It faces the Canal Grande, adjacent to the Rialto Bridge.

== History ==
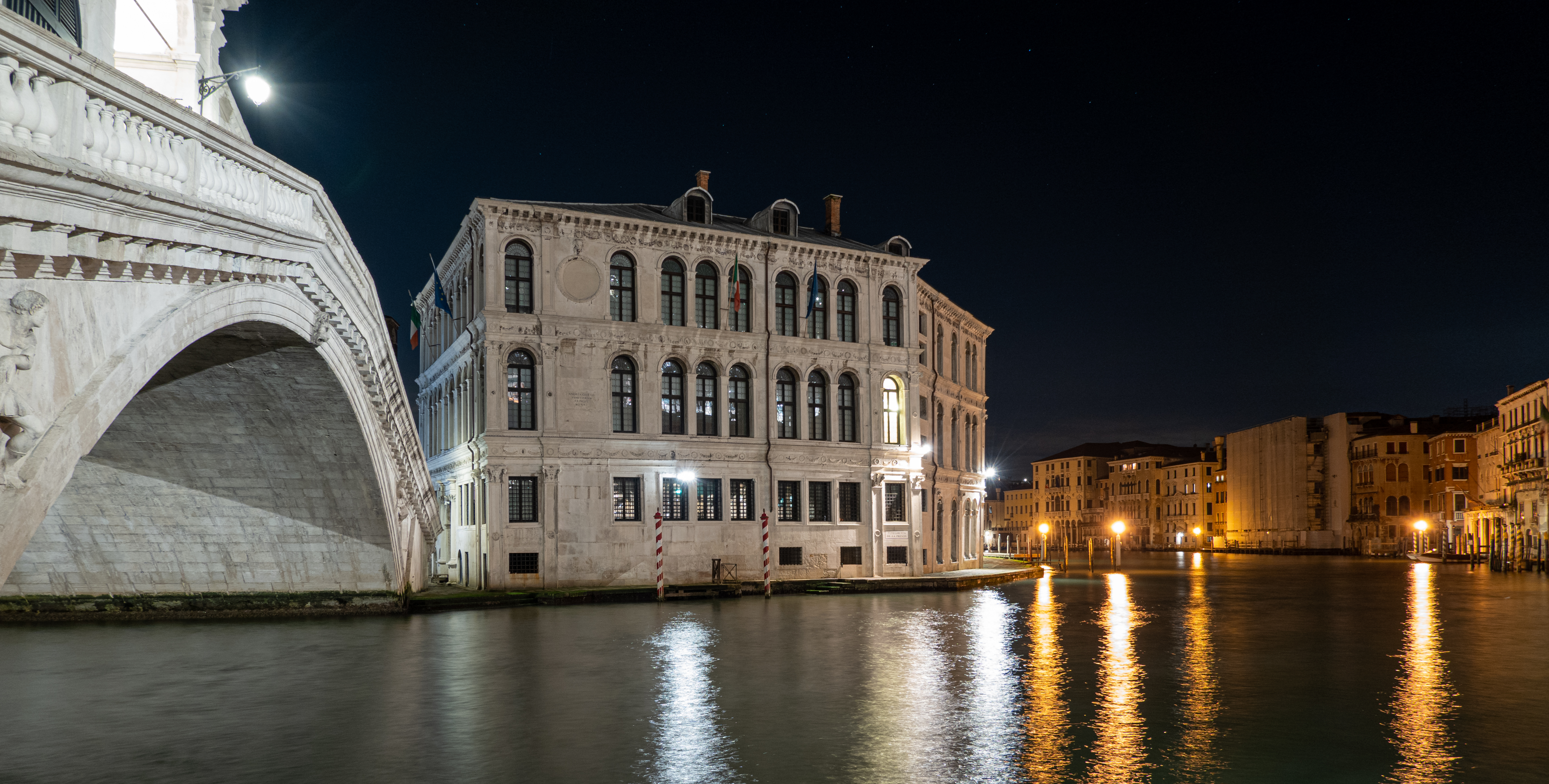
Palazzo dei Camerlenghi by night

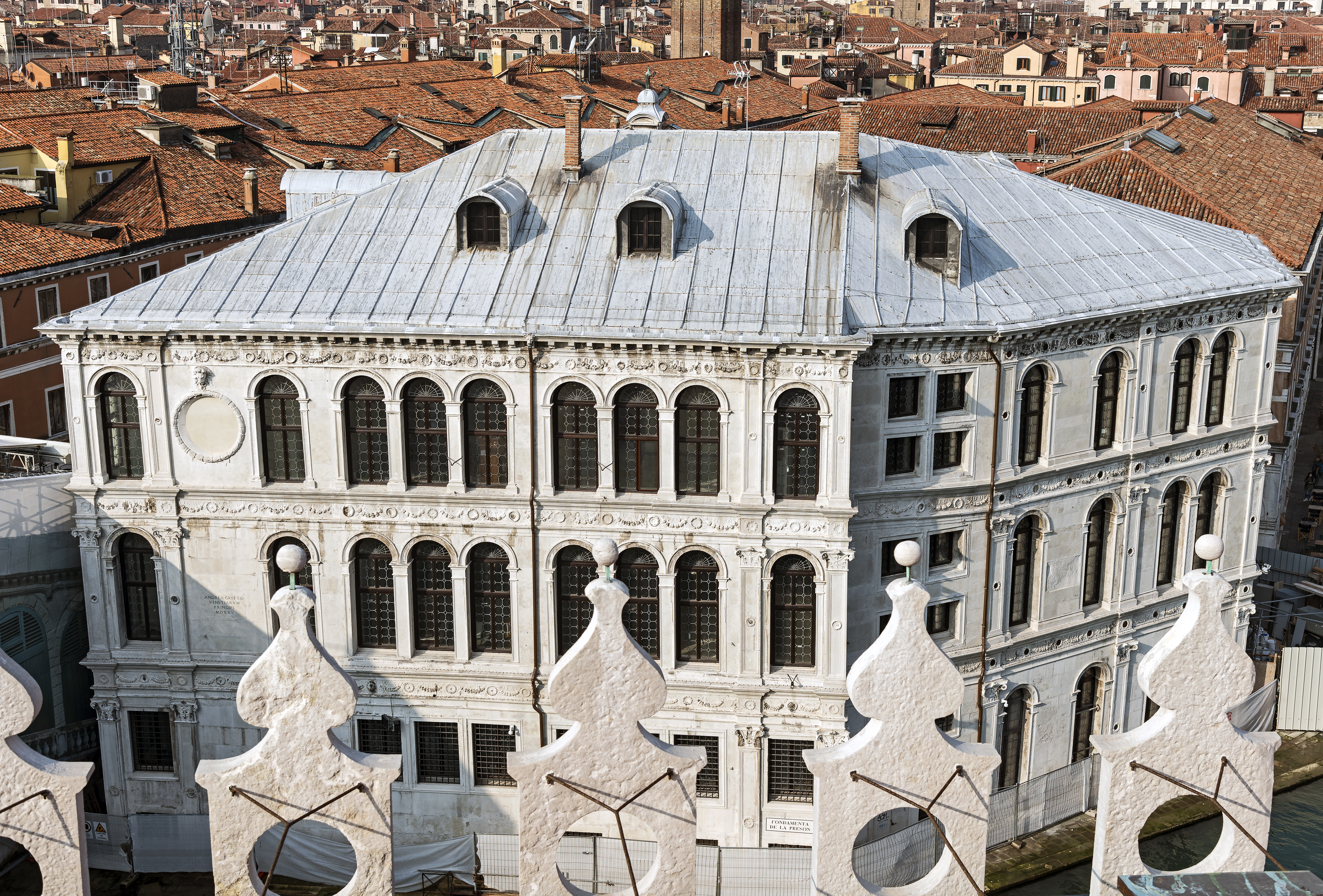
Viewed from the terrace of the Fondaco dei Tedeschi

The palazzo was built in the fifteenth century and finished in 1488. From 1525 to 1528 it was enlarged according to a design by Guglielmo dei Grigi, who was inspired by the style of Mauro Codussi and Pietro Lombardo. It was the headquarters for several financial magistrates, including the Camerlenghi di Comun, from whom it takes its name, the Consuls of the Traders and the Supra-Consuls of the Traders. Due to this function, the lower floor was used as a jail for those who defaulted on their debts: the location near the crowded Rialto Bridge served as an admonition for the people passing by.

The palazzo currently houses the regional main offices of the Italian Comptroller and Auditor General.

== Description ==
The three-storey palazzo has a pentagonal floor plan which follows the shoreline of the Grand Canal. It has tall windows with centrings, divided by false columns and decorated with friezes. There were once polychrome marble and porphyry slabs, now lost. The medallion on the facade once incorporated a painted St Mark's lion.

Due to the Venetian tradition that, when leaving their post, magistrates would leave a religiously themed painting and a portrait in their former office, the Palazzo dei Camerlenghi came to house numerous artworks. Sometimes these paintings expressed social-political notions of civic virtue. These were removed during the French occupation; some eventually returned to Venice, mostly to the Gallerie dell'Accademia.

== See also ==
- Rialto Bridge
- Canal Grande
- Palazzo dei Dieci Savi

== Sources ==
- Brusegan, Marcello (2007). I palazzi di Venezia. Newton Compton. pp. 108–109.
- Cottrell, Philip: Corporate Colors: Bonifacio and Tintoretto at the Palazzo Dei Camerlenghi in Venice
- Hamilton, Paul C. The Palazzo dei Camerlenghi in Venice. Journal of the Society of Architectural Historians 42 (1983) 258–271.
- Kölmel, Nicolai: The Queen in the Pawnshop: Shaping Civic Virtues in a Painting for the Palazzo dei Camerlenghi in Venice.In: Burghartz et al: Sites of Mediation. Connected Histories of Places, Processes, and Objects in Europe and Beyond, 1450–1650. Brill, Leiden 2016. doi: 10.1163/9789004325760_006
