= Guglielmo Bergamasco =

Italian sculptor

Guglielmo Bergamasco (also known as Guglielmo dei Grigi; c. 1485 – 1550) was an Italian architect and sculptor of the Renaissance period.

He was born in Alzano Lombardo, near Bergamo, and later moved to Venice. He was a relative of Pietro Bon, and perhaps apprenticed under him.

He designed and helped build various structures including the Venetian Palazzo dei Camerlenghi (1525–1528) or the Portello Gate at Padua, built in 1519.

The high altar in the church of San Salvador is attributed to him. He also executed the Sant'Anna Chapel in the church of Madonna della Grazia, on the island of San Giorgio Maggiore.

His son Giangiacomo was also an architect and sculptor, who worked with Palladio.
