= Fehl =

Fehl is a surname. Notable people with the surname include:

- Fred Fehl (1906–1995), American photographer
- Philipp Fehl (1920–2000), Austrian artist and historian
- Raina Fehl (1920–2009), Austrian-born American writer, historian, and editor

== See also ==
- Fell (surname)
