= Ateneo Veneto =

Palace in Venice

Coordinates: 45°26′03″N 12°20′02″E

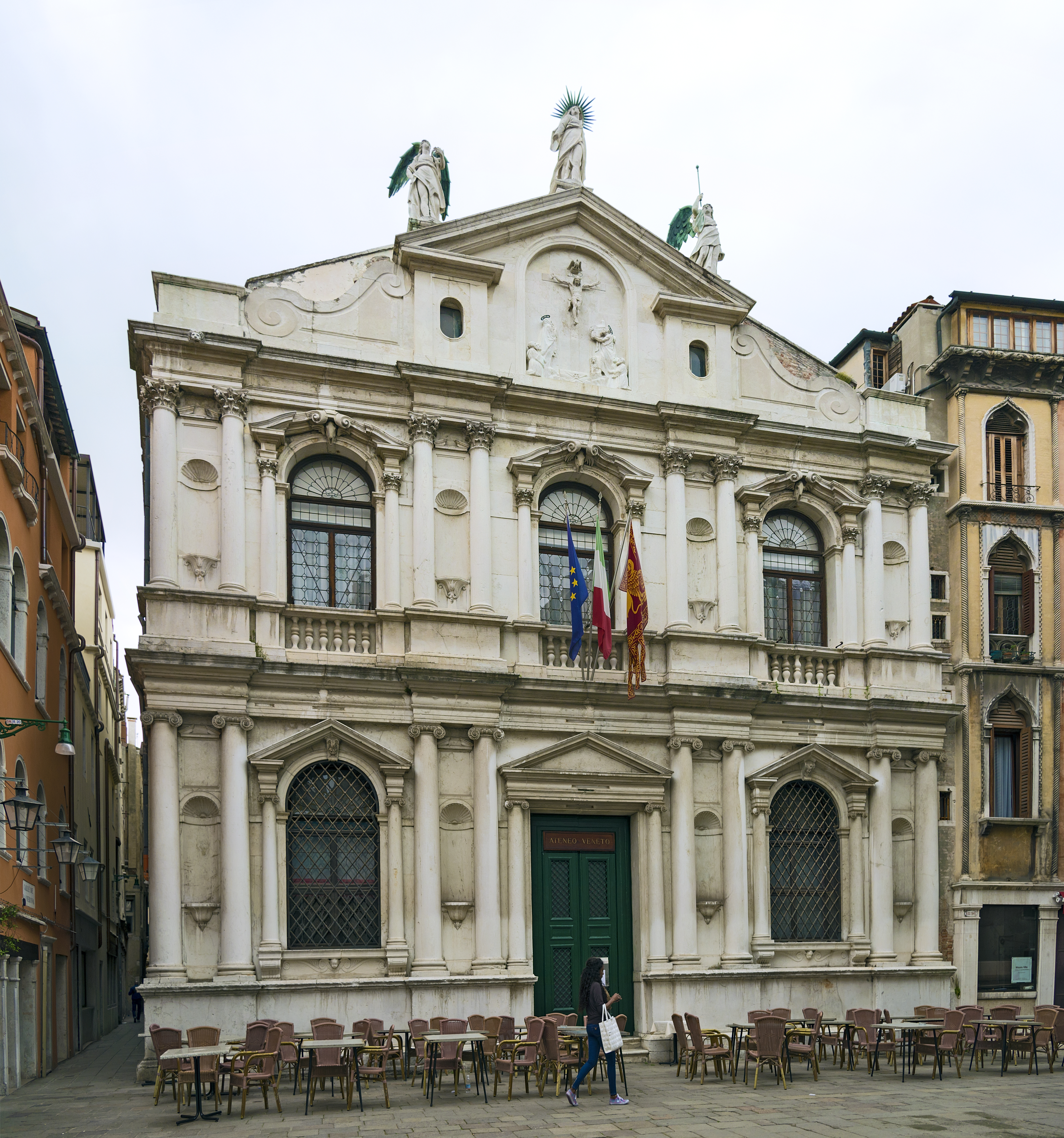
Façade of the Scuola di San Fantin, today the Ateneo Veneto, pictured from the steps of La Fenice

The Ateneo Veneto di Scienze, Lettere ed Arti is an institution for the promulgation of science, literature, art and culture in all forms, in the exclusive interest of promoting social solidarity, located in Venice, northern Italy. The Ateneo Veneto is made up of 300 members resident in the city and in the province of Venice, elected by the Assembly, which is also responsible for appointing the chairman and the academic council. Honorary, Non-Resident and Foreign Members, elected by the Assembly also participate in the life of the Ateneo.

The Ateneo Veneto was formed on 12 January 1812 through the merger of the Società Veneta di Medicina, the Accademia dei Filareti, and the Accademia Veneta Letteraria pursuant to a decree of Napoleon I dated 25 December 1810. The first chairman was Leopoldo Cicognara.

It was the Ateneo Veneto that saw the first stirrings of Venetian liberalism, with speeches by Daniele Manin, who was president of the short-lived Republic of San Marco from 1848 to 1849, and by Niccolò Tommaseo. Throughout the 19th and 20th centuries the Ateneo Veneto acted as a forum for debates on crucial matters for the city in the fields of culture, science, art, literature, medicine, politics, economics and law. Such free discussions on major issues have continued to characterize the Ateneo Veneto, testifying to its civic, social and cultural commitment.

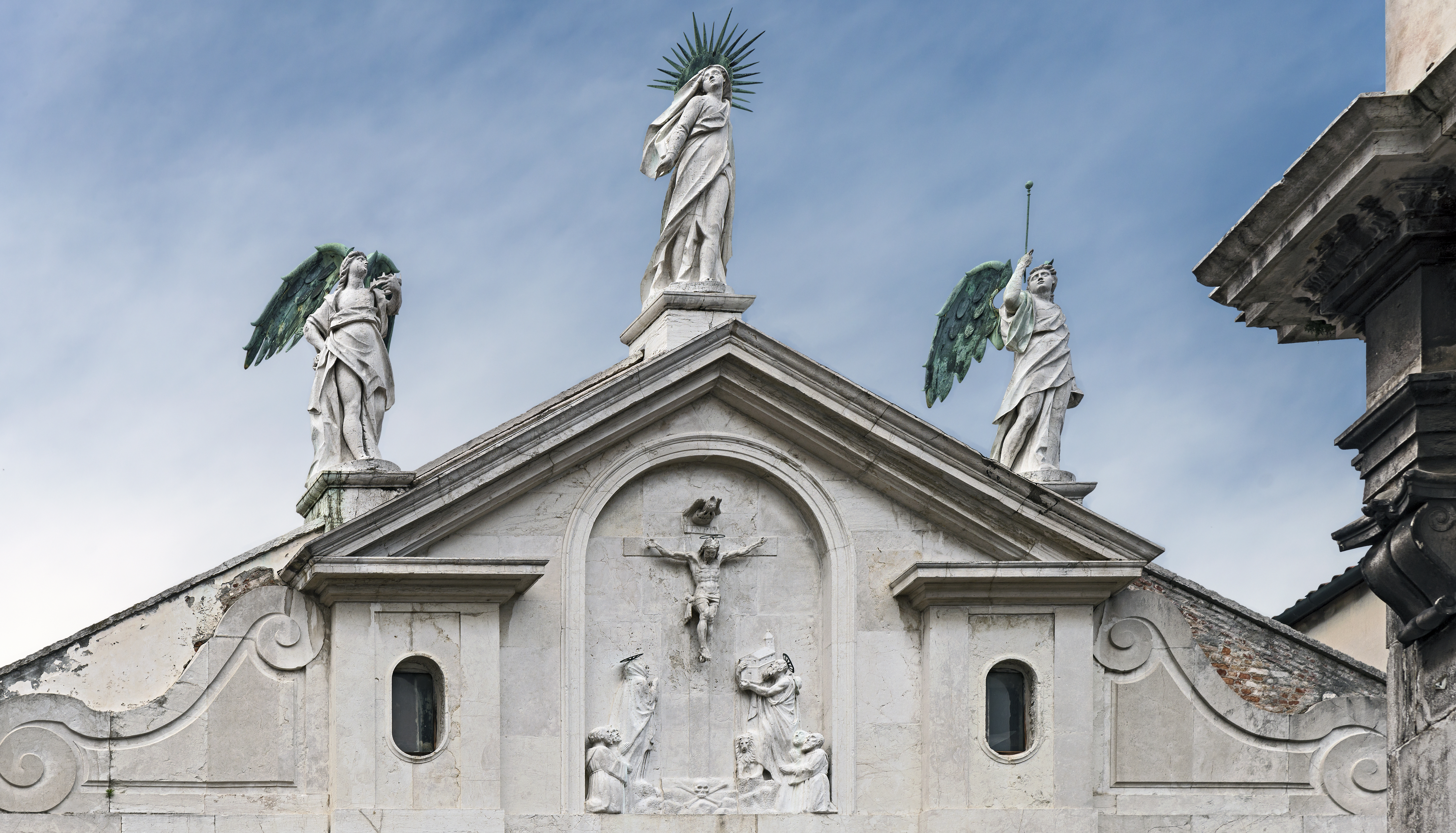
Pediment and Madonna and Angels 1584 crowning the facade by Alessandro Vittoria

== History ==
Originally the building hosted a confraternity, the Scuola Grande di San Fantin, also known as the Scuola di San Girolamo or Scuola di Santa Maria e di San Girolamo (devoted to justice), as stated in the official documents of the Venetian Republic, more commonly referred to as "di San Fantin" or "dei picai" ("of the hanged men"). During the sixteenth century a number of great architects, painters and sculptors of the Baroque and Mannerist schools embarked upon a major reconstruction of the Scuola; by the beginning of the seventeenth century the building was more or less as one sees it now. The church on the ground-floor is now the conference-hall. The albergo, on the first floor, is a reading-room: around 1664 the albergo piccolo was added (now the "Sala Tommaseo"), as was the new sacristy on the ground floor (now a meeting-room). On the top floor is the library which contains around 40,000 volumes, some of them of inestimable historic and artistic value. The art-collection, with works by Tintoretto, Veronese, Palma il Giovane, Antonio Zanchi, Francesco Fontebasso, Pietro Longhi and Alessandro Vittoria, is also extremely valuable.

The Ateneo Veneto, a non-profit organization, institution of science, literature and arts, is committed to making full use of its historical and artistic heritage (the building, art-collection and library) and to the pursuit of cultural activities (scholarly studies, courses in history, science, literature and art, lectures, conferences, theatrical, musical and cinematic events, exhibitions and the Torta Prize for restoration) and social initiatives (hosting local associations and committees without their own premises, collaborating with the institutions of the city, co-organizing University courses for senior citizens held at the Ateneo Veneto, contributing to the cultural education of young students and scholars through subsidized training-courses in the library and the Ateneo Veneto, and co-operating with the city's cultural organizations). It will continue to expand its services, including recreational activities connected with the above-mentioned initiatives, using the Internet and multi-media facilities.

== Presidents ==
- 1811–1817 Leopoldo Cicognara
- 1817–1822 Francesco Aglietti
- 1822–1826 Carlo Antonio Gambara
- 1826–1832 Carlo Pietro Biaggi
- 1832–1842 Leonardo Manin
- 1842–1845 Daniele Renier
- 1845–1848 Leonardo Manin
- 1848–1851 Andrea Giovannelli
- 1851–1853 Bartolomeo Bizio
- 1853–1857 Giovanni Querini Stampalia
- 1857–1860 Alvise Francesco Mocenigo
- 1860–1862 Gerolamo Dandolo
- 1862–1865 Antonio Berti
- 1865–1868 Giacinto Namias
- 1868–1869 Giovanni Minotto
- 1869–1872 Giuseppe Calucci
- 1872–1876 Giuseppe Maria Malvezzi
- 1876–1882 Demetrio Busoni
- 1882–1886 Domenico Giuriati
- 1886–1890 Paulo Fambri
- 1890–1891 Angelo Minich
- 1891–1896 Paulo Fambri
- 1896–1898 Marco Diena
- 1898–1902 Ajessandro Pascolato
- 1902–1907 Filippo Nani Mocenigo
- 1907–1911 Luigi Carlo Stivanello
- 1911–1915 Filippo Nani Mocenigo
- 1915–1919 Ferruccio Truffi
- 1919–1921 Davide Giordano
- 1921–1925 Giuseppe Jona
- 1925–1929 Davide Giordano
- 1929–1933 Giovanni Bordiga
- 1934–1938 Luigi Marangoni
- 1938–1942 Davide Giordano
- 1942–1947 Carlo Alberto Dell'Agnola
- 1947–1951 Ernesto Pietriboni
- 1951–1955 Antonio Romani
- 1955–1958 Arturo Pompeati
- 1958–1963 Giacomo Giorgio Tosoni Gradenigo
- 1963–1967 Enzo Milner
- 1967–1971 Sandro Marconi
- 1971–1975 Pietro Zampetti
- 1975–1979 Giuseppe La Monaca
- 1979–1983 Sergio Perosa
- 1983–1988 Alessandro Bettagno
- 1988–1993 Cartlo Rubbia
- 1993–1996 Giovanni Castellani
- 1996–2001 Giannantonio Paladini
- 2001–2005 Alfredo Bianchini
- 2005–2009 Antonio Alberto Semi
- 2009–2013 Michele Gottardi
- 2013 (incumbent) Guido Vittorio Zucconi

== Bibliography ==
- Pietro Zampetti, Guida alle Opere d'arte della Scuola di San Fantin - Ateneo Veneto, Ateneo Veneto, Venezia 2003, pp. 183
