= Leopoldo Cicognara =

Italian artist, art collector, art historian and bibliophile (1767–1834)

Count Leopoldo Cicognara
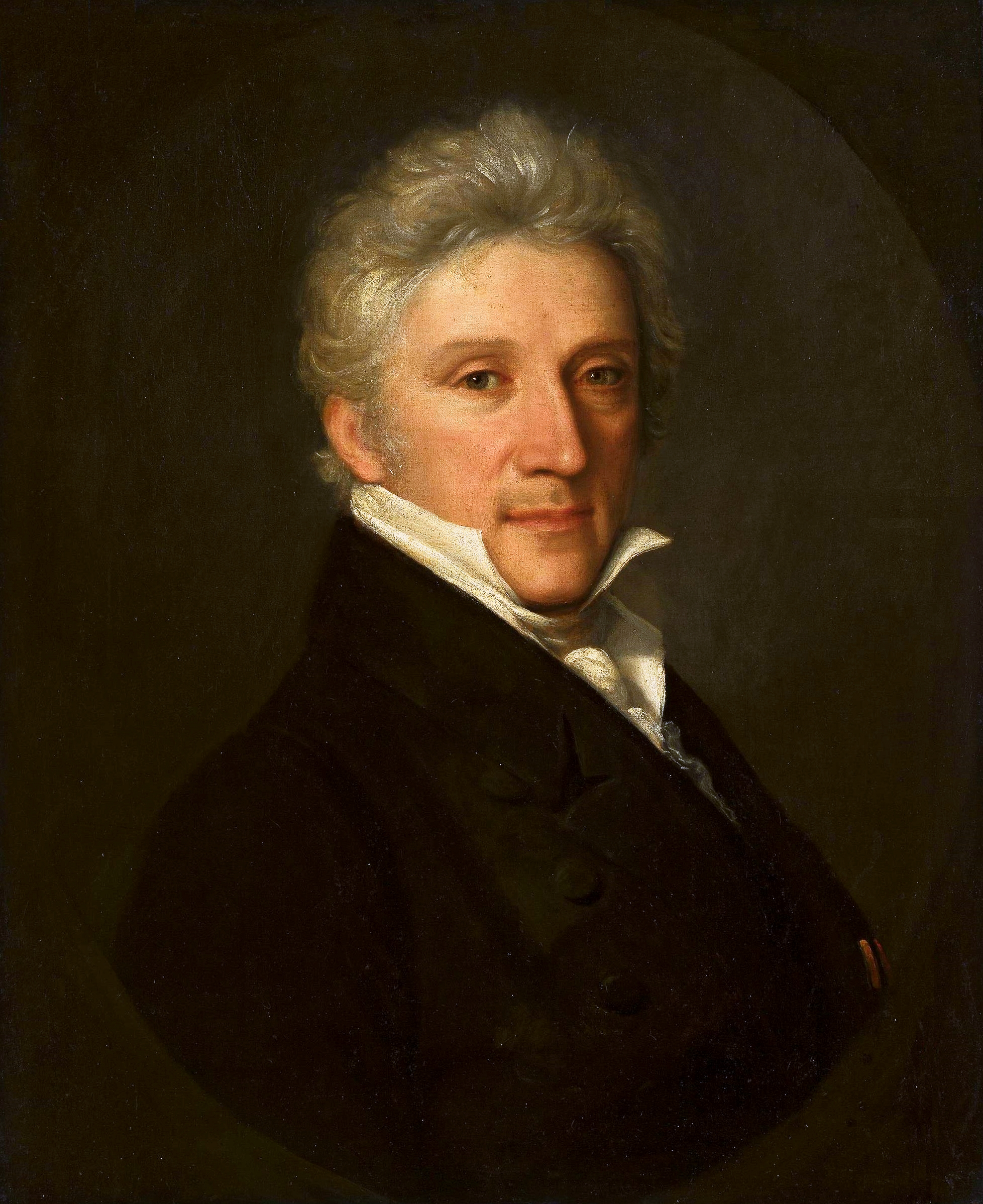
- Portrait by Natale Schiavoni (1825)
- Born: 17 November 1767; Ferrara, Papal States
- Died: 5 March 1834 (aged 66); Venice, Kingdom of Lombardy–Venetia
- Occupation: Art Historian
- Known for: Contribution to the rise of the neoclassical movement
- Parent(s): Filippo Cicognara and Luigia Cicognara (née Gaddi)

Academic work
- Era: Age of Enlightenment
- Discipline: Art history, archaeology
- Institutions: Accademia di Belle Arti di Venezia
- Notable works: Storia della scultura dal suo risorgimento in Italia al secolo di Napoleone (1813–18)

Count Leopoldo Cicognara (17 November 1767, in Ferrara – 5 March 1834, in Venice) was an Italian artist, art collector, art historian and bibliophile.

== Early life, education, and political career ==
Cicognara attended the Collegio dei Nobili in Modena from 1776 to 1785. From 1788 to 1790, he attended the Società dell'Arcadia in Rome where he studied painting under Jacob Philipp Hackert and Domenico Corvi. There he also became interested in art criticism and archeology. He later he visited Naples and Sicily, and published one of his first works of poetry in Palermo. Cicognara studied archeology during travels to Florence, Milan, Bologna and Venice.

In 1795, he moved to Modena and began a brief political career, becoming a member of the legislative body, serving as a councilor of state, and minister plenipotentiary of the Cisalpine Republic at Turin. Napoleon decorated him with the Iron Crown.

== Academic career and scholarship ==
Cicognara left politics in 1805 to devote himself to art history. He settled in Venice and in 1808 was made president of the Accademia di Belle Arti di Venezia, a position he held until 1826. He was influential in opening the Galleria dell’Accademia to the public in 1817, increasing the number of the professors at the academy, improving the curriculum, and establishing prizes.

In 1808, his treatise Del bello ragionamenti, which he dedicated to Napoleon, was published by Molini e Landi with the types of the famous Amoretti Brothers. in the treatise Cicognara laid out the principal tenets of his Enlightenment and Neoclassical aesthetics. He upheld the important role played by philosophy in education and in the practice of art, championed the cause of progress in art, and dealt with the concepts of ‘absolute beauty’, ‘relative beauty’, ‘ideal beauty’, ‘grace or grazia’, and ‘the sublime’.

From 1808 to 1826 Cicognara was President of the Accademia di Belle Arti di Venezia, whose role, he believed, was to serve the public. It was largely due to him that the Gallerie dell'Accademia was opened to the public in 1817.

Between 1813 and 1818 Cicognara published his magnum opus, Storia della scultura dal suo risorgimento in Italia al secolo di Napoleone, tracing the evolution of Italian sculpture from the point at which Winckelmann and Séroux d’Agincourt had terminated their study and demonstrating the links between artistic, literary and political phenomena. Illustrated with 180 plates, Cicognara's work is not a collection of artists’ biographies in the style of Vasari, but a fresh description of a historical period that encompasses both Early Italian art and the minor arts. He open-mindedly took into account the writings of controversial authors such as Pierre-François Hugues d'Hancarville, Edward Gibbon and Charles-François Dupuis. The work is subdivided into five sections – Rebirth, Progress, Perfection, Corruption and the Status Quo – each dominated by an artistic personality (Nicola Pisano, Donatello, Michelangelo, Bernini and Canova respectively). In the composition of his monumental work Cicognara was encouraged and advised by Pietro Giordani and August Wilhelm Schlegel.

In 1814, after the fall of Napoleon, Cicognara was patronized by Francis I of Austria, and between 1815 and 1820 published, under the auspices of that sovereign, his Fabbriche più cospicue di Venezia, two folios, containing some 150 plates. The work, written in conjunction with the academic Antonio Diedo and the architect Gian Antonio Selva, is a history of Venetian architecture by period, illustrated with scaled drawings made by pupils at the Accademia.

Charged by the Venetians with the presentation of their gifts to the Princess Caroline Augusta of Bavaria at Vienna, Cicognara added to the offering an illustrated catalogue of the objects it comprised; this book, Omaggio delle Provincie Venete alla maestri Carolina Augusta, since became of great value to bibliophiles.

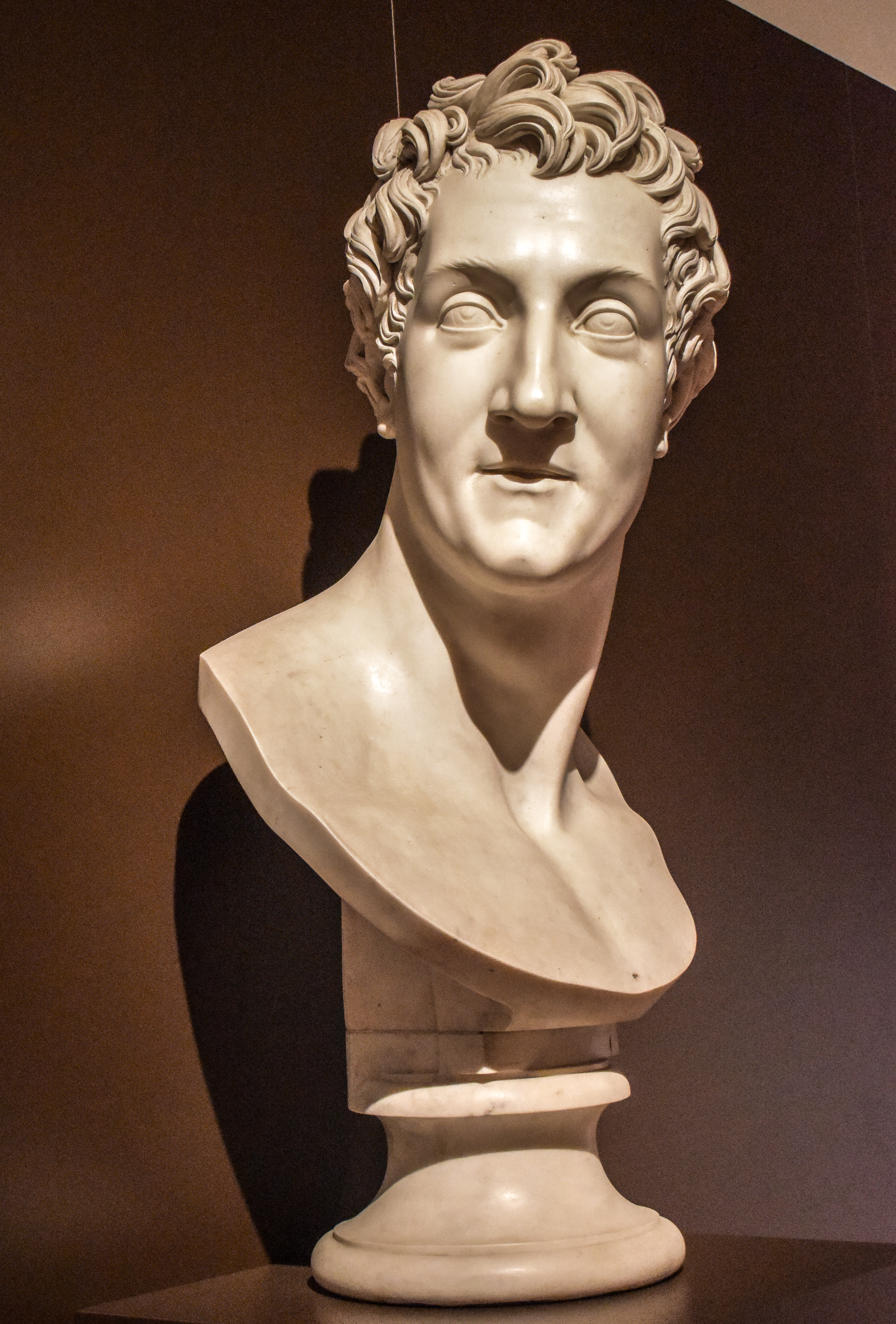
Bust of Leopoldo Cicognara by Antonio Canova, Musei civici di Arte Antica, Palazzo Schifanoia, Ferrara

In 1820 he strengthened his ties with Canova: both men had contributed to the education of the young Francesco Hayez. In 1822 Canova sculpted a portrait bust of him in marble (unfinished; Ferrara Charterhouse), which was eventually set on his tomb. Cicognara also had close intellectual ties with Quatremère de Quincy, with whom he corresponded after they had met in Paris in 1819. Their positions on aesthetics and on the concept of art history are, however, distinct: Cicognara had a less dogmatic and intolerant approach towards such areas as Romantic art, melodrama, Venetian painting, sculpture before Canova, Etruscan and archaic art and Gothic architecture. In addition, he condemned sterile and slavish ‘imitation’ and upheld the need for originality, expressing a belief in artistic progress.

With his wide-ranging European contacts Cicognara helped establish the idea of the professional connoisseur and critic, the custodian of artistic heritage and promoter of cultural and educational activities. He remained active in cultural affairs, contributing articles to such reviews as the progressive Antologia in Florence and the Venetian periodical Giornale di belle arti e tecnologia. In 1831 he published a study of copperplate printing. He was then invited to Parma by Marie Louise, Duchess of Parma, and assisted with the arrangement of the art gallery there. He also (1832) put forward the names of Giuseppe Jappelli and Bertel Thorvaldsen for the monument to Palladio in the cemetery at Vicenza. In 1833, he was elected into the National Academy of Design as an Honorary Academician. Cicognara died in Ferrara on 17 November 1767.

The other works by Cicognara are the Memorie storiche de litterati ed artisti Ferraresi (1811); the Vite de' più insigni pittori e scultori Ferraresi, MS.; the Memorie spettanti alla storia della calcografia (1831); and a large number of dissertations on painting, sculpture, engraving and other kindred subjects. His work was attacked by Romantic critics but has been revalued in the 20th century.

== Cicognara Library ==
During his career, Cicognara collected about five thousand volumes on art and archeology, an important resource for scholars. In 1821 he published at Pisa a well-known catalog of his collection, the result of thirty years labor, the Catalogo ragionato de’ libri d’arte e di antichità, considered a milestone in fine art bibliography and bibliophilia. In 1824 his library was purchased en bloc by Pope Leo XII, and added to the Vatican Library.

Philipp Fehl and Raina Fehl were the directors of The Leopoldo Cicognara Program at the University of Illinois Library, dedicated to the study and promulgation of literary sources in the history of art, 1987–2007. They cataloged the collection of work found in the Fondo Cicognara at the Vatican Library.

The Digital Cicognara Library is a collaborative project aiming to create an online version of the Fondo Cicognara by digitizing each title in the collection.

== List of works ==
- Le belle arti. Ferrara: Per gli eredi di G. Rinaldi. 1790.
- Lettera ad un amico su di alcune attuali controversie giudiciarie e su diverse opinioni degli eruditi intorno al Panteon di M. Agrippa detto la Rotonda. Pisa: Impresso co' caratteri di Firmino Didot. 1807.
- Del bello: Ragionamenti. Florence and Pisa. 1808.
- Storia della scultura dal suo risorgimento in Italia sino al secolo di Napoleone per servire di continuazione alle opere di Winckelmann e di d'Agincourt. 3 vols. Venice: Nella tipografia Picotti. 1813–1818.
- De' propilei e della inutilità e dei danni dei perni metallici nella costruzione degli edifizii. 3 vols. Venice: Nella Tip. di Alvisopoli. 1814.
- Le fabbriche più cospicue di Venezia... 2 vols. Venice. 1815–1820.
- Catalogo ragionato de' libri d'arte e di antichità. Pisa: N. Capurro, co' caratteri di F. Didot. 1821.
- Biografia di Antonio Canova, aggiuntivi il catalogo completo delle opere. Venice: G. Missiaglia. 1823.
- Storia della scultura dal suo risorgimento in Italia fino al secolo di Canova. 8 vols. Prato: Frat. Giachetti. 1823–1825.
- Memorie spettanti alla storia della calcografia. Prato. 1831.

== Bibliography ==
- Romanelli, Gian Domenico (1981). "CICOGNARA, Francesco Leopoldo". Dizionario Biografico degli Italiani (in Italian). Vol. 25: Chinzer–Cirni. Rome: Istituto dell'Enciclopedia Italiana. ISBN 978-88-12-00032-6.
- Rodgers, David (2001). "Cicognara, (Francesco) Leopoldo, Count". The Oxford Companion to Western Art. Oxford: Oxford University Press.

Preceded by -	President of Ateneo Veneto; 1811–1817	Succeeded by Francesco Aglietti
