= Antonio Berti =

Antonio Berti may refer to:

- Antonio Berti (politician) (1812–1879), Italian politician and senator
- Antonio Berti (painter) (1830–1912), Italian painter
- Antonio Berti (sculptor) (1904–1990), Italian sculptor and medalist

== See also ==
- Tony Berti (born 1972), former professional American football player
