= Fred Fehl =

American photographer

Fred Fehl (January 21, 1906 – October 4, 1995) was an American photographer of Viennese birth and upbringing. He was the cousin of the art historian Philipp Fehl and the inventor and Electrical Engineer Paul Eisler.

Fehl escaped from Vienna in 1939 with the assistance of the company he worked for, went to briefly to London, and then to New York City. The first person in America to make a career of performance photography, for over forty years he covered Broadway as well as dance, opera, and music. He was the permanent photographer of the American Ballet Theatre, the New York City Opera, and the New York City Ballet. His pictures have appeared in The New York Times, major national magazines, and in hundreds of books on theater, dance, and music.

Fehl took photographs of over 1,000 Broadway plays. Included are photographs of Shirley Booth, José Ferrer, Judith Anderson, Maurice Evans, Lilli Palmer, Melvyn Douglas, Louis Calhern, Celeste Holm, Helen Hayes, Henry Fonda, Claude Rains, Beatrice Lillie, Rex Harrison, Ethel Merman, Charles Boyer, John Garfield, Ezio Pinza, Mary Martin, Arlene Francis, Eddie Cantor, Gwen Verdon, and Marlon Brando.

In addition to the American Ballet Theatre and the New York City Ballet, Fred Fehl photographed the Ballet Russe de Monte Carlo, the Joffrey Company, Martha Graham, and the Alvin Ailey Company.

His numerous dance photographs include Martha Graham, Vera Zorina, André Eglevsky, Rudolf Nureyev, Mikhail Baryshnikov, Suzanne Farrell, Peter Martins, Heather Watts, Darci Kistler, Barbara Fisher, Kyra Nichols, Alicia Markova, Erik Bruhn, Carla Fracci, Natalia Makarova, Judith Jamison, Violette Verdy, Allegra Kent, Patricia McBride, José Limón, Dame Margot Fonteyn, Agnes de Mille, Anton Dolin, Alexandra Danilova, Maria Tallchief, Lupe Serrano, Tanaquil LeClercq, Jillana, Diana Adams, Rosella Hightower, Gelsey Kirkland, Cynthia Gregory, Karin von Aroldingen, Kay Mazzo, Fernando Bujones, Jacques d'Amboise, Edward Villella, Alicia Alonso, and many others.

Fehl's opera photographs include the New York City Opera, the San Carlo Opera, Alexander, Igor Kipnis, Margaret Severn, Roberta Peters, Norman Treigle, Judith Raskin, Dame Joan Sutherland, and Beverly Sills. He photographed the New York Philharmonic Concerts at Lewisohn Stadium. His photographs of conductors and musicians includes Eugene Ormandy, Dmitri Mitropolous, John Browning, André Watts, Alesander Brailowsky, Eugene List, Lorin Maazel, Andre Kostelanez, Igor Markevitch, Lukas Foss, Bruno Walter, Arturo Toscanini, Julius Rudel, and Leopold Stokowski.

The Harry Ransom Center and the New York Public Library hold many Fred Fehl photographs and books.
