= Erich Fritz Schweinburg =

American writer (1890–1959)

- Born: June 11, 1890; Nikolsburg, Moravia
- Died: July 7, 1959 (aged 68); Rochester, Vermont
- Occupations: Writer, attorney
- Spouse(s): Rosa Gussman Schweinburg, Divorced 1926
- Children: Raina Fehl

Erich Fritz Schweinburg (June 11, 1890 – July 7, 1959) was a Jewish-Austrian writer and attorney. He is best known for writing Eine weite Reise, published in Austria, his account of the year he spent as a prisoner in Dachau concentration camp in Nazi Germany.

== Biography ==
=== Early life ===
Schweinburg was born on June 11, 1890, in Nikolsburg, Moravia. He was the eldest son of Emanuel and Leontine (née Czinczar). His younger brothers were Erwin and Franz. The family were builders. In Nikolsburg Moravia, there was a residential street named for his relative Emil Schweinburg a benefactor of Jews and Christians alike: Emil Schweinburg Strasse now called Husova Street. It was the hub street in the Jewish Ghetto.

=== Attorney ===
Schweinburg practiced in the law courts of Vienna. In New York, as an attorney, with Henrietta Kierman he compiled a "Bibliography on Political, Economic and Social Backgrounds of Certain European Countries", for the Department of Statistics in 1944 at the Russell Sage foundation. In 1945 he wrote the book "Law Training in Continental Europe, Its Principles and Public Function".

=== Writing career ===
Schweinburg was an author of novels, short stories. He also published a public service book entitled Law Training in Continental Europe: Its Principles and Public Function

He is best known for his autobiographical work Eine Weite Reise, Wien : Löcker, 1988.

=== New York and Vermont ===
Schweinburg worked for the Russell Sage Foundation.

=== Personal life ===
Born to a wealthy Jewish family, Schweinburg attended the University of Vienna. He became an attorney. He and Rosa Gussman married in Austria and had one child, Raina Schweinburg, married to Philipp Fehl.

== Bibliography ==
- Eine weite Reise, Schweinburg, Erich F.. - Wien : Löcker, 1988
- Law training in continental Europe, Schweinburg, Erich F.. - New York, NY : Russell Sage Foundation, 1945
- Ein Weg zur Vorbereitung des menschlichen Singapparates für den Kunstgesang, Schweinburg, Ernst. - Wien : Europ. Verl., 1937
- Das Europäische Speditionsrecht, Wien VI : Zoll-Speditions- u. Schiffahrtszeitung, 1929
- Berliner politische Nachrichten, Berlin : Schweinburg

== See also ==
- List of Austrian writers
