= Francesco Aglietti =

Italian physician and writer (1757–1836)

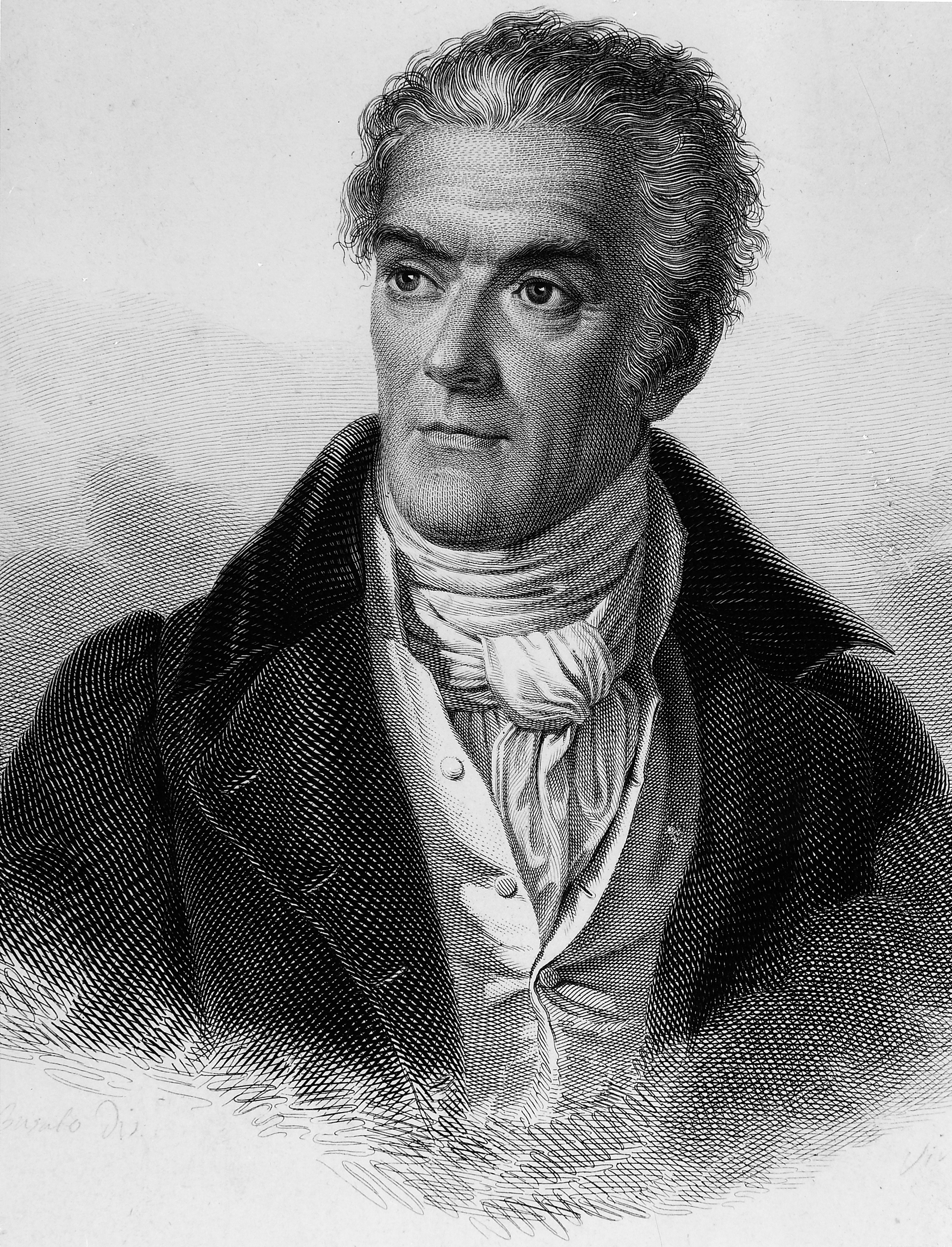
Francesco Aglietti

Francesco Aglietti (1 November 1757 Brescia, Republic of Venice – 3 May 1836 Venezia) was an Italian medical doctor and writer.

Aglietti was the second President of the Ateneo Veneto di Lettere Scienze ed Arti.

With Antonio Gualandris and Stefano Gallino, in 1793 he founded Il Giornale per servire alla storia ragionata della medicina di questo secolo. Upon his death, his library included 10,000 volumes.

== Works ==
- Sulla litiasi delle arterie (1800)
- Delle lodi (1836)

Preceded by Leopoldo Cicognara	President of Ateneo Veneto; 1817–1822	Succeeded by Carlo Antonio Gambara
