= Carlo Antonio Gambara =

Italian composer

Carlo Antonio Gambara was an Italian mandolinist and composer in the early 19th century. He composed works during a time when interest in mandolin music was stagnant. He was also a knight of the Order of the Couronne de Fer, born a nobleman. He attended a college for the sons of nobility at Parma, studying mandolin there for eight years, under Caunetti, maestro di cappella and violin playing with Gasparo Ghiretti

He was referred to by the title Cavaliere in Philip J. Bone's musician's biography. The Order of the Iron Crown (Couronne de Fer) was an honorary order founded on 5 June 1805 in Milan by Napoleon I, acting as king of the Kingdom of Italy (1805-1814), on the model of the Legion of Honor. The order was restored in Milan by the Emperor of Austria, King of Lombard-Venetian Kingdom, in 1816.

== Works ==
Gambara's compositions are principally instrumental, and include:

- Four symphonies for grand orchestra
- Quintet for mandolin, harp, violin, viola and violoncello
- Il trionfo d'amore, 1806 by Friedrich von Schiller; Odoardo Donesmondi; Carlo Antonio Gambara; Marianna Guerrieri
- Haydn coronato in Elicona: Poemetto, 1809
- Inno ad Imeneo, 1811 Carlo Antonio Gambara; Angela Martinengo; Odoardo Donismondi
- La festa delle grazie di Cristoforo Wieland, 1822 by Christoph Martin Wieland; Carlo Antonio Gambara

== See also ==
- Order of the Iron Crown (in Italian)

Preceded by Francesco Aglietti	President of Ateneo Veneto; 1822–1826	Succeeded by Carlo Pietro Biaggi
