= Antonio Berti (politician) =

Italian politician

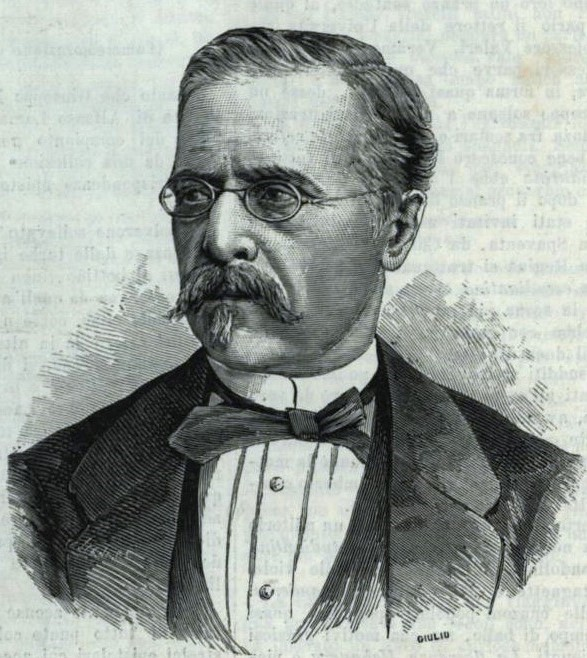
Antonio Berti

Antonio Berti (20 June 1812, in Venice – 1879) was an Italian politician and senator. Berti was born into a wealthy family in Venice. He soon moved to Treviso where he managed two mills.

== Biography ==
After earning his medical degree in 1842 from the University of Padua, he became the town physician in Teolo and married Teresa Macoppe of Padua; in 1846, he moved to Montagnana, where he continued to serve as a town physician. He served as a military doctor during the siege of Venice, the city where he subsequently settled. He wrote several medical treatises and memoirs, and also ventured into other fields such as meteorology. Always in poor health, he was severely weakened after falling ill during a Senate session in early 1879; he suffered a second attack of angina pectoris that proved fatal during a Venice City Council session on March 24 of that year.

Preceded by Gerolamo Dandolo	12th President of Ateneo Veneto; 1862–1865	Succeeded by Carlo Pietro Biaggi
