= Sergio Perosa =

Italian linguist

Sergio Perosa (born 27 November 1933 in Chioggia) is an Italian linguist, translator, Anglicist, and literary critic. He is best known for his books L'arte di F. Scott Fitzgerald (1961), Storia del teatro americano (1982), Teorie inglesi del romanzo 1700–1900 (1983), Teorie americane del romanzo 1800–1900 (1986), Transitabilità. Arti, paesi, scrittori (2005), L’albero della cuccagna. Classici e post-coloniali di lingua inglese (1st. edition in 2004, 2nd edition in 2009), Henry James e Shakespeare (2010), and Studies in Henry James (2013). He was on the jury of the Grinzane Cavour Prize from 1982 to 2003.
