= Philipp Fehl =

Austrian-American artist and art historian

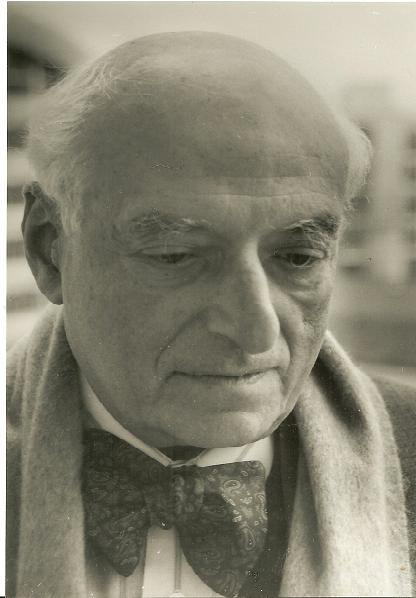
- Philipp Fehl at Work in 1996
- Born: Philipp Pinchas Fehl; 9 May 1920; Vienna, Austria
- Died: 11 September 2000 (aged 80); Rome, Italy
- Resting place: Prima Porta Cemetery; Rome, Italy
- Known for: Painting; Pen and Ink; Art Historian
- Spouse: Raina Fehl
- Children: 2
- Website: philippfehl.com

Philipp Pinchas Fehl (May 9, 1920 – September 11, 2000) was an Austrian born American artist and art historian.

== Early life ==
Fehl was born in Vienna, Austria, to Hugo Fehl and Friederike "Frieda" Fehl (née Beck - previous married name Singer). He was the cousin of the renowned ballet photographer Fred Fehl. His older cousin, Paul Eisler, attended Gymnasium, and Fehl determined that he also wanted this classical higher education for gifted students.

Fehl became a refugee in 1938, eventually emigrating to the United States in 1941. He became an artist, author and lecturer at several universities. He retired as professor emeritus from the University of Illinois at Champaign-Urbana in 1990. In the same year he and his wife the classicist Raina Fehl, initiated the Cicognara Project at the Vatican Library.

He was accepted and attended Bundes Real Gymnasium and continued to attend school after the Anschluß. After Matura, (graduation), he emigrated to England. He worked for a time in Birmingham as an apprentice commercial artist with the firm Stagg Displays before immigrating to the United States of America in 1940, becoming a citizen in 1943.

From 1940 to 1942, Fehl attended the School of the Art Institute of Chicago, where he studied painting. In 1943, he transferred to Stanford University, where he got his B.A. in Romance Languages. In 1948, Fehl received his M.A. in History of Art from Stanford University. Fehl was at the University of Chicago from 1948 to 1952. He was one of the graduate students participating in the Committee on Social Thought. In 1963 he received g a Ph.D. with a dissertation on "The Classical Monument: Reflections on the Connection Between Morality and Art in Greek and Roman Sculpture." In 1972 a version of this study was published by the New York University Press.

== Career ==
=== Early work ===
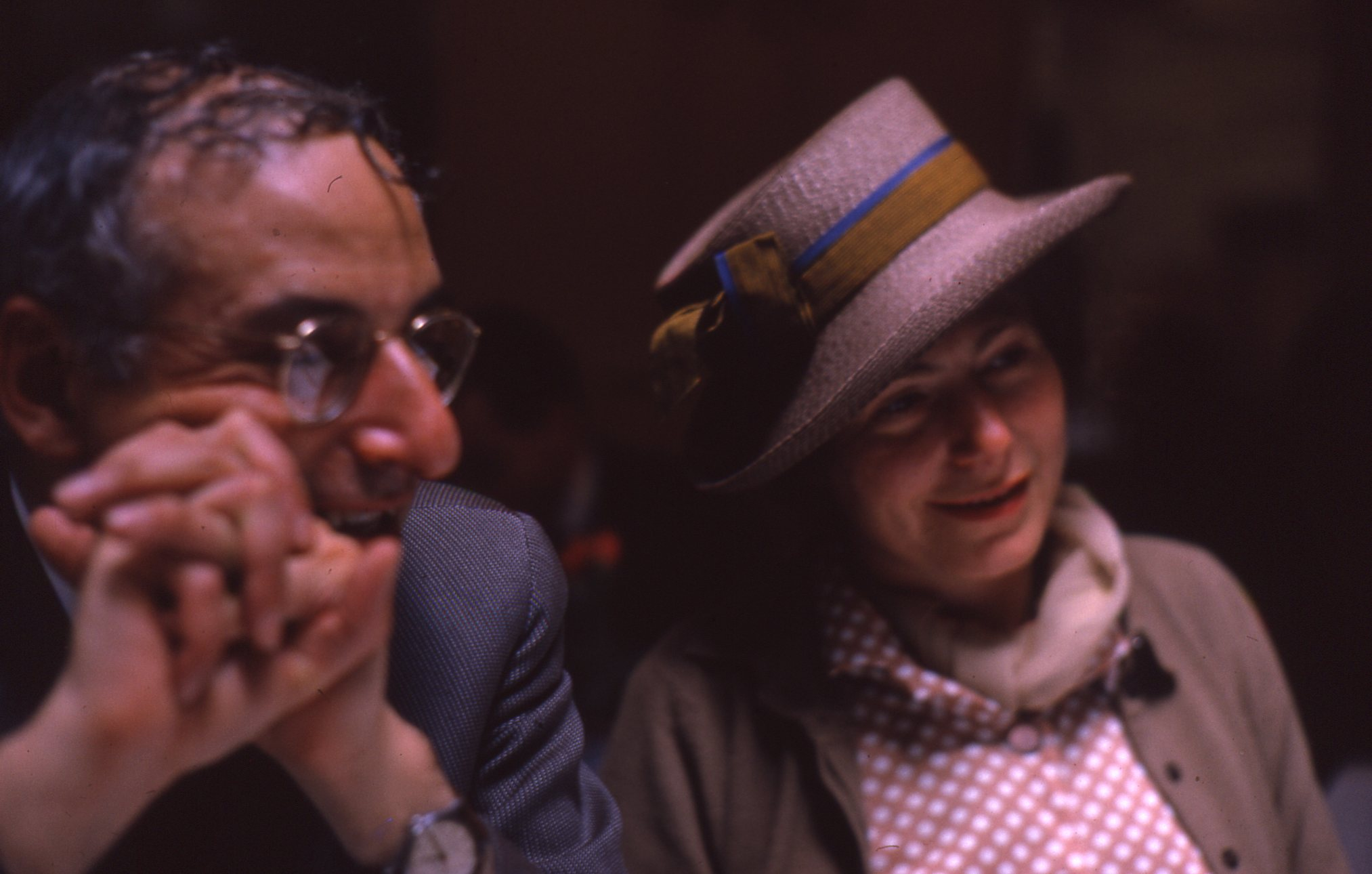
Philipp and Raina Fehl in London in the early 1960s

From 1941 through 1942 he attended the School of the Art Institute of Chicago in Fine Arts, Painting. In 1943 he enrolled in the US Army. From 1945 to 1946 he worked as instructor to the Office of the Provost Marshal General's re-educational program for German Prisoners of War at Camp Butner, North Carolina. In 1945 he married Raina Fehl daughter of the writer Erich Fritz Schweinburg, also born in Vienna. After his discharge from the Army, he and Raina were given appointments as interrogators at the Nuremberg War Crimes Tribunal (1946–1947).

Through his work at the trials, he became well acquainted with a number of war criminals who had exercised direct influence on German art as well as others who committed crimes against humanity. He gives detailed descriptions of his work at the trials in the portion of his memoirs entitled "The Ghosts of Nuremberg", The Atlantic Monthly, vol. 229, no. 3, March 1972, 70–80.

He returned to Stanford University, taking a B.A. in Romance Languages, French, and an M.A. in History of Art. His Master's Thesis, "A Stylistic Analysis of Some Propaganda Posters of World War II", 1948, showed the existence, and defined the formal manifestations of the international "Blut und Boden" style which governed the propaganda art of countries confronting each other in World War II. In 1948 he moved back to Chicago, where he continued his studies at the University of Chicago in painting and graphic arts as well as history of art. At the University of Chicago, he was friends with the now renowned philosopher, Seth Benardete and the comedians Severn Darden, Elaine May and Mike Nichols. In 1963 he obtained his Ph.D. from the University of Chicago; Philipp Fehl was one of the graduate students participating in the Committee on Social Thought, and his thesis, The Classical Monument: Reflections on the Connection Between Morality and Art, was written under the committee's aegis (his thesis was partly published in 1972 as "The Classical Monument", see bibliography).

"His legacy resides in a long and distinguished list of art historical publications, in thousands of witty and melancholy drawings, in the microfiches of the Fondo Cicognara, and in the enjoyment of art he inspired in his students and friends. He also entrusted to us an indelible testimony of the inhumanity of Nazi Europe. In person, he was distinguished by a quick, nervous, ironic intelligence, an engaging warmth, a sense of humor. He spoke English with a vast vocabulary and the accent of his native Vienna, absorbing ideas and parsing them with broad learning and brilliant asides. As an artist he thought in images and metaphors that enlivened his conversation and sharpened his memory. He wrote as he spoke, with wit and passion. He was never dull."

— Marilyn Perry, Artibus et Historiae, 2003

=== Teaching ===
He and his work are discussed in the comic-philosophical novel Harmony Junction by Goddard Graves (2009, privately published).

While studying he also began to teach, 1949–1950 photography with the Youth Program of Temple Sinai, Chicago, 1951–1952 as director of The Bateman School, Chicago, 1951–1954 as a lecturer in art at University College, University of Chicago ("Experimental figure drawing according to 18th century methods") and 1951–1963 as an instructor in Home Studies, University of Chicago ("Elementary Figure Drawing in the Academic Tradition"). He started academic teaching in 1951 as a lecturer at the University of Chicago and, after holding a number of other academic appointments and receiving numerous honours (see list), retired in 1990 as Professor Emeritus from the University of Illinois.

He began to make pen and ink drawings of bird like characters (who closely resembled him physically) dressed in the peruke and trousers of the 18th century. He called these drawings "capricci". The bulk of these capricci are now preserved in the Exile's archives at the German National Library, Deutsche Nationalbibliothek.

- University College, University of Chicago. Lecturer, 1951–1954.
- Department of Home Study, University of Chicago. Instructor (part-time), 1951–1963.
- University of Kansas City, Kansas City, Missouri. Instructor, 1952–1954.
- University of Nebraska, Lincoln. Assistant Professor, later associate professor, 1954–1963.
- University of North Carolina at Chapel Hill. Associate Professor, later Professor, 1963–1969.
- University of Illinois, Urbana-Champaign. Professor 1969 - 1990. Professor Emeritus, 1990-. Director, Summer Seminar for College Teachers, National Endowment for the Humanities, University of Illinois, 1978 and 1981.
- Visiting appointments at
  - University of California, Berkeley, 1960, 1963;
  - Brown University, 1967; Trinity College at Rome, Summer 1971;
  - Tel Aviv University, Winter, 1982; The Hebrew University, Jerusalem, Spring 1992.
  - Central European University, Prague, Spring 1993.

=== Honors ===
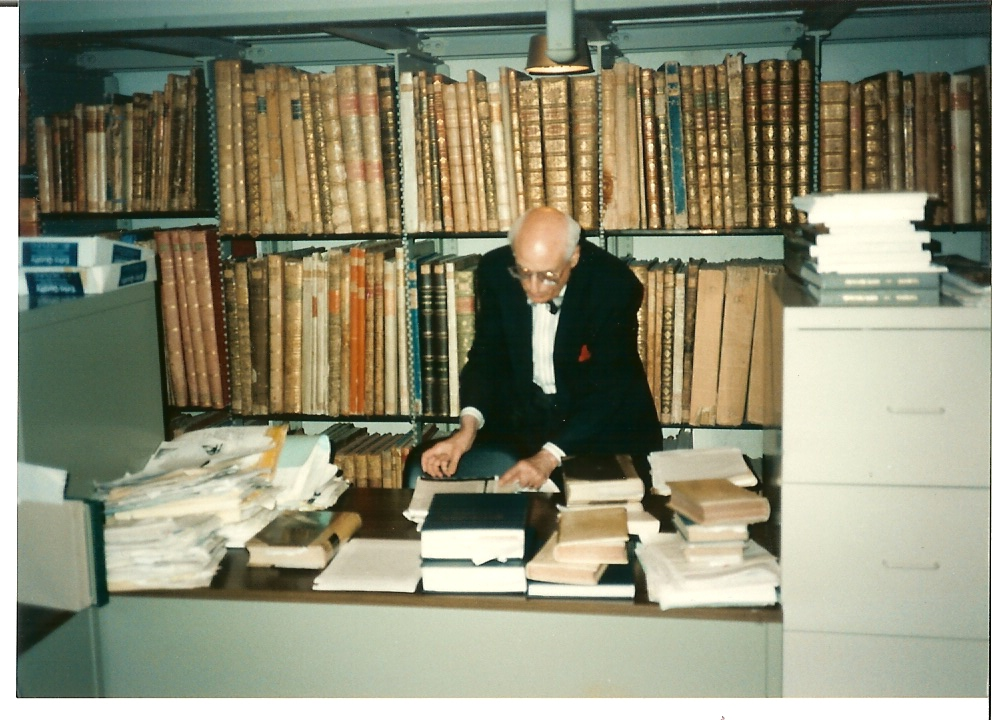
Philipp Fehl at work in 1996

- 1952: Belgian-American Educational Foundation, Fellow, Brussels Art Seminar
- 1952–1953: Warburg Institute of the University of London, Research Fellow
- 1963–2000: Committee on Social Thought, University of Chicago, Associate
- 1967–1968: American Academy in Rome, Art Historian in Residence
- 1977–1978: National Endowment for the Humanities, Fellow
- 1970–2000: University of Illinois, Center for Advanced Study – Associate (1970–1971, 1981–82, 1989–90)
- 1990–2000: University of Illinois, Center for Advanced Study – Resident Associate

=== Offices ===
- 1965–1969: American Council of Learned Societies, Committee for Awards in the Humanities
- 1966–1969: Committee for the Administration of the Medieval and Renaissance Institute of Duke University and the University of North Carolina
- 1965–1968: The Art Bulletin, Editor for Book Reviews
- 1967–1971: College Art Association of America, Board of Directors
- 1973–1975: American Institute of Archaeology f/k/a Central Illinois Archaeological Society, President
- 1975–1977: American Institute of Archaeology f/k/a Central Illinois Archaeological Society, Board of Directors
- 1975–1977: The Dunlap Society (Washington, D.C.), Advisory Council
- 1976–1978: Institute of International Education (New York), Selection Committee for Kress Fellows
- 1976–1978: Midwest Art History Society, Publication Committee
- 1975–2000: Gazette des Beaux-Arts, Advisory Council
- 1977- : NEH Division of Public Programs, Board of Reviewers for grant proposals
- 1997–2000: International Survey of Jewish Monuments, President and Advisory Council
- 1980–1983: Midwest Medieval Society of America, Board of Directors
- 1983–1996: Dictionary of the History of Classical Archaeology (ed. Nancy de Grummond), Consultant editor
- 1968–1991: College Art Association of America, Art Bulletin Committee
- 1982–1990: American Academy in Rome, Advisory Council
- 1986–2000: Committee for the Advancement of Early Studies, Ball State University, Advisory Council
- 1987–2000: Director, The Leopoldo Cicognara Program at the University of Illinois Library, dedicated to the study and promulgation of literary sources in the history of art

=== Membership in Learned Societies ===
College Art Association of America, Renaissance Society of America, South Eastern Renaissance Society, Central Renaissance Society, American Society for Aesthetics and Art Criticism, Midwest Art History Society, Midwest Medieval Society of America, International Survey of Jewish Monuments.

- Honorary Associate, Centro Studi Monopolis: Arte e Cultura, Monopoli, Puglia, 1984–2000.
- Corresponding Member, Ateneo Veneto, Venice, 1988–2000.
- Corresponding Member, Braunschweigische Wissenschafliche Gesellschaft, Klasse für Geisteswissenschaften, 1992-.

=== Listed in ===
- Directory of American Scholars
- Who's Who in American Art
- Who's Who in Austria
- Dictionary of International Biography
- The Writers Directory
- Who's Who in the Midwest
- International Authors and Writers Who's Who
- Who's Who in Europe
- Who's Who in Society

== Personal life ==
Fehl was married to classicist Raina Fehl. He and Raina were married for 54 years. The Fehls lived primarily in Rome from 1990 until his death in 2000. He is buried at Prima Porta in Rome. Raina died in 2009. They had two daughters, Katharine "Kathy" Fehl" and Caroline "Lynn" Coulston.

== Art ==
Capricci – Pen and Ink

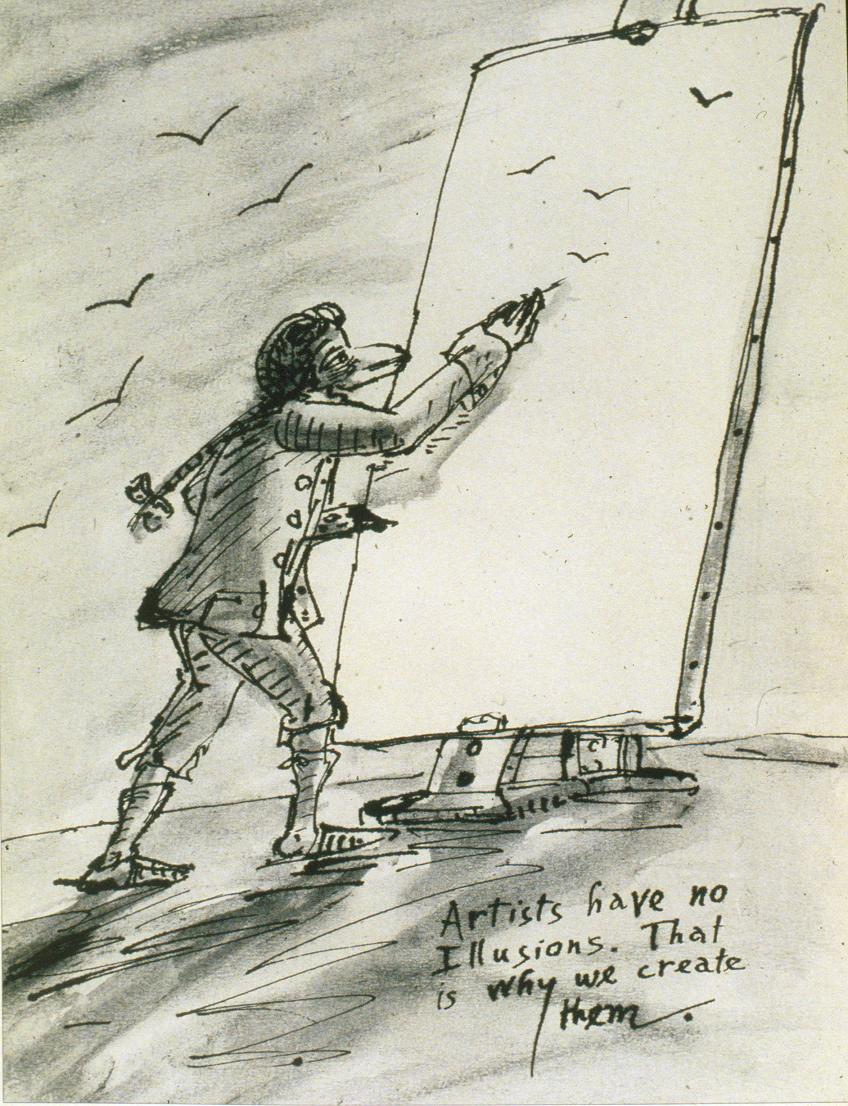
Artists Have No Illusions. That Is Why We Create Them.
Pen and Ink Wash

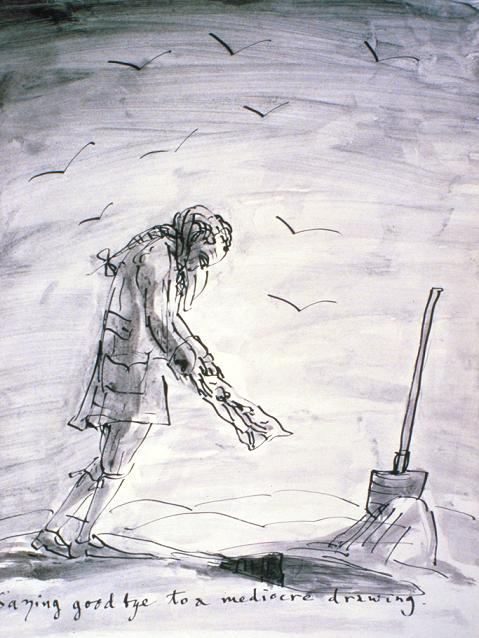
Saying Good bye to a mediocre drawing.
Pen and Ink Wash

Oils

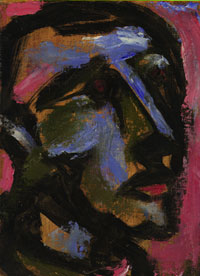
Self Portrait in Oil
Oil (c. 1950)

== Publications of works of art ==
Carolina Quarterly, Winter 1966, 21–27. Sample Copy, University of North Carolina, Chapel Hill, North Carolina, 1968: "Series", 5 pages. Lillabulero, Chapel Hill, North Carolina, VII, 1969, 86, 96, 100. The Bird (serigraph and original pen and ink drawings), Finial Press, Urbana, Illinois, 1970. Capricci, selection and introduction by Wilfried Skreiner, Neue Galerie am Landesmuseum Joanneum, Graz, 1971. Also Published in German, same title. Voyages, Chapel Hill, North Carolina, IV, 1971, nos. 1–2, 39, 63, 67; nos. 3–4, 64, 65, 85, 89, 163; V, 1973–1974, nos. 1–4, 109. Au Verso (St. John's College, Santa Fe, New Mexico), 1972, "Aging", 10 pages. North Carolina Museum of Art Bulletin, XII, 1975, no. 4; 11. Archaeological News, IV, 1975, no. 1; 7, 11. Polity, Summer 1977, title page. Birds of a Feather (with an introduction by Maurice Cope), University of Illinois Press, Champaign, Illinois, 1991.

== Critiques and reproduction of drawings in newspapers ==
Daily Tar Heel, The Courier, The News-Gazette, Kleine Zeitung, Kultur, William and Mary News, The Cavalier Daily, Illini Week. The Carolina Quarterly, Lillibulero

== Exhibitions ==
=== Solo shows ===
- Art Gallery of Chapel Hill, Chapel Hill, North Carolina, 1968, 1970.
- Neue Galerie am Joanneum, Graz, "Capricci," 1971.
- Roberts Gallery, London, 1971.
- Galerie im Stock, Vienna, Austria, 1973.
- Folger Shakespeare Library (Ann Hathaway Gallery), Washington D.C. "Birds on Crutches," 1973.
- Peoria Art Guild, Peoria, Illinois, "Birds of a Feather," 1975.
- University of Illinois (Department of Art and Design), 1969, 1974.
- College of William and Mary, Williamsburg, Virginia, 1977.
- Kenyon College, Gambier, Ohio, "New Capricci," 1979.
- Mt. Holyoke College, South Hadley, Mass., "New Capricci," 1979.
- Società Dante Alighieri, Venice, Italy, 1980–81.
- Department of Art, Tel Aviv University, 1982.
- Herzog August Bibliothek, Wolfenbüttel, 1982.
- Kunsthistorisches Institut, Universität Kiel, 1983.
- Gallery ?Nature's Table?, Urbana, Illinois, 1984.
- University of Virginia Art Museum, Charlottesville, Virginia, April–June 1986 (a retrospective exhibition of Capricci: "A Poet's Progress"). Catalogue essay by Paul Barolsky.
- University of Delaware Perkins Student Center Gallery, A Poet's Progress," April 1987.
- Hallside Gallery at the University of Utah, Department of Medical Illustration, Salt Lake City, "Capricci," October–November, 1987.
- Gallery ?Nature's Table?, Urbana, Illinois, "New Capricci," November–December 1987.
- Gallery 107 Mercer Street, New York, New York, "Capricci," April–May, 1989.
- Krannert Museum of Art and Kinkaid Pavilion, "Birds of a Feather," September, 1991.
- Miracles Cafe, Cardiff By The Sea, California, "Capricci" June–July 1992.
- Central European University, Prague, "Birds of a Feather," Spring, 1993.
- Exil Archiv, Die Deutsche Bibliotek, Adickesallee 1, D-60322 Frankfurt am Main, November 2001 through early January 2002.

=== Group shows ===
- Exline, Fehl, and Lancaster, Krannert Art Museum, University of Illinois, 1971.
- Figures, The Anderson Gallery, Champaign, Illinois: April–May, 1986.
- Rethinking the Avant-Garde, Kotonah Gallery, Kotonah, New York, April–May, 1986: catalogue by Jonathan Fineberg.

=== Annual exhibitions ===
- Renaissance Society of the University of Chicago, 1948–1963. (drawings, prints, glass-etchings).
- University of Illinois Faculty Show, Krannert Art Museum, 1969–1986.

=== Works in public collections ===
Pieces of Fehl's work are owned by both private and public collections including, but not limited to the Beach Museum at Kansas State University, The American Academy in Rome, the Krannert Museum at the University of Illinois in Champaign-Urbana and the Vatican Library.

- Neue Galerie am Joanneum, Graz, Austria.
- North Carolina Museum of Art, Raleigh, N.C.
- Krannert Art Museum and Kinkaid Pavilion (University of Illinois), Champaign, Illinois.
- U.S. Embassy to the Czech Republic, Prague

== Works and publications ==
=== Books ===
- (ed. and transl.) Nicolas Cochin the Younger and Denis Diderot, A Course in Drawing, being the plates and notes on figure drawing in the Encyclopédie ou Dictionnaire Raisonné des Arts et des Métiers of 1751, University of Chicago, 1954.
- (with Patricia Fenix) texts for War I Propaganda Posters: Selections from the Bowman-Gray Collection of Materials Related to World War I and World War II, Ackland Art Center, Chapel Hill, North Carolina, 1969.
- The Classical Monument: Reflections on the Connection between Morality and Art in Greek and Roman Sculpture. New York University Press, New York, 1972.
- (with Stephen Prokopoff) Raphael and the Ruins of Rome: The Poetic Dimension. Exhibition Catalogue, Krannert Art Museum, Champaign, IL, 1983.
- (with Judith Dundas and Stephen Prokopoff) The Jest and Earnestness of Art: A History of the Capriccio in Prints. Exhibition Catalogue, Krannert Art Museum, Champaign, IL, 1987
- (ed. and transl., with Keith Aldrich and Raina Fehl) Franciscus Junius the Younger, The Literature of Classical Art: I. The Painting of the Ancients. London 1638. II. Catalogus Architectorum, Mechanicorum sed praecipue Pictorum, Statuariorum . ... Rotterdam, 1694. University of California Press, Berkeley, California, 1992.
- Decorum and Wit: The Poetry of Venetian Painting. Essays in the History of the Classical Tradition. Bibliotheca Artibus et Historiae, Vienna, 1992.
- (ed. with a translation by J. K. Newman and an essay on Chelidonius by Thomas F. Kelly) Albrecht Dürer's "Small Passion" of 1511 with its Latin Text by Benedictus Chelidonius (forthcoming).
- 'Sprezzatura' and the Art of Painting Finely. Open-ended Narration in Paintings by Apelles, Raphael, Michelangelo, Titian, Rembrandt and Ter Borch. The Ninth Gerson Lecture. Groningen, 1997.
- Monuments and the Art of Mourning: The Tombs of Popes and Princes in St. Peter's. Unione Internazionale degli Istituti di Archeologia, Storia e Storia dell'Arte in Roma. 2007.
- (editor-in-chief until September 2000) The Art and Architecture Library of Count Leopoldo Cicognara (1767–1834). A reprint on microfiche of all the works contained in the Fondo Cicognara of the Vatican Library (circa 5000 books and pamphlets). The publication program, known as the Cicognara Project, is a joint venture of the Vatican Library and the University of Illinois Library. (work in progress). See http://www.cicognara.com website.

=== Articles ===
- "Test of Taste", College Art Journal, XII, 1953, 233–248.
- "Coordination of Art History. Studio Work and Museum Study", Midwestern College Art Conference 1953, Report of the Meetings at Kansas City and Lawrence. Kansas City, Missouri, 1954, 39–41, 46.
- "Arts vs. Birds and Beasts" (Letter to the editor), College Art Journal, XIV, 1954, 55–56.
- "The Hidden Genre: A Study of the "Concert Champêtre" in the Louvre", Journal of Aesthetics and Art Criticism, XVI, 1957, 153–168.
- "Questions of Identity in Veronese's "Christ and the Centurion'", Art Bulletin, XXXIX, 1957, 301–302.
- "A Statuette of the Pugilist Creugas by Antonio Canova", Register of the Museum of Art of the University of Kansas, no. 10, June 1958, 13–24.
- "The Rocks on the Parthenon Frieze", Journal of the Warburg and Courtauld Institutes, XXXIV, 1961, 1–44.
- "Manfred L. Keiler" (obituary), College Art Journal, XXI, 1961, 30–31.
- "Veronese and the Inquisition: a study of the subject matter of the so-called "Feast in the House of Levi"", Gazette des Beaux-Arts 103, LVIII, 1961, 325–354.
- "Practical Observations on the Development of a Taste for the Beautiful", Four Quarters, XI, no. 3 (March 1962), 8–11.
- "The Fineness of the Visual Arts: Notes on the Survival of a Humanistic Tradition", Speculum Humanitatis (Bulletin 11 of the Southern Humanities Conference). Lexington, Kentucky, 1964, 53–60.
- "Bernini's Triumph of Truth over England", Art Bulletin, XLVIII, 1966, 404–405.
- "Rodolphe Toepffer's Course in Figure Drawing for Men of Humorous Curiosity and Good Will", Carolina Quarterly, Winter 1966, 16–28.
- "Canova's "Hercules and Lichas": notes regarding a small bronze in the North Carolina Museum of Art", North Carolina Museum of Art Bulletin, VIII, 1968, no. 1, 2–25.
- "Thomas Appleton of Livorno and Canova's Statue of George Washington", Festschrift Ulrich Middeldorf, ed. Antje Kosegarten and Peter Tigler. Berlin, 1968, 523–552.
- "Realism and Classicism in the Representation of a Painful Scene: Titian's "Flaying of Marsyas" in the Archiepiscopal Palace at Kromeriz", Czechoslovakia Past and Present, ed. Miloslav Rechcigl Jr. The Hague, 1969, II, 1387–1415.
- "The Final Version of Michelangelo's Tomb of Julius II", Renaissance Papers, 1968 (South Eastern Renaissance Conference), Duke University, Durham, North Carolina, 1969, 85–87.
- "On the dark Side of the Love of Art", Theology Today, XXVII, 1970, 207–211.
- "Peculiarities in the Relation of Text and Image in two Prints by Peter Bruegel: "The Rabbit Hunt" and "Fides"", North Carolina Museum of Art Bulletin, IX, 1970, no. 3–4, 24–35.
- "A Literary Keynote for Pompeo Batoni's "The Triumph of Venice"", North Carolina Museum of Art Bulletin, X, 1971, no. 3, 2–15.
- "Mass Murder or Humanity in Death (Reflections on Dürer's "Martyrdom of the Ten Thousand" and Bruegel's "Massacre of the Holy Innocents")", Theology Today, XXVIII, 1971, no. 1, 52–71.
- "Michelangelo's "Crucifixion of St. Peter": Notes on the identification of the locale of the action", Art Bulletin, LIII, 1971, 326–343.
- "John Trumbull and Robert Ball Hughes' Restoration of the Statue of Pitt the Elder", New York Historical Society Quarterly, LVI, 1972, 6–28.
- "Rubens' "Feast of Venus Verticordia"", Burlington Magazine, LXIV, 1972, no. 828, 159–162.
- "Sehnsucht in Arkadien: Bemerkungen zu Pastoralgemälden von Giorgione und Tizian", Mitteilungen der Gesellschaft für vergleichende Kunstforschung in Wien, XXIV, 1972, no. 3, 16–17.
- "The Ghosts of Nuremberg", The Atlantic Monthly, vol. 229, no. 3, March 1972, 70–80.
- "On the Representation of Character in Renaissance Sculpture", Journal of Aesthetics and Art Criticism, XXXI, 1973, 291–307.
- "The Placement of Canova's "Hercules and Lichas" in the Palazzo Torlonia", North Carolina Museum of Art Bulletin, XI, 1973, no. 3, 14–27.
- "Pictorial Precedents for the Representation of Doge Lionardo Loredano in Batoni's "Triumph of Venice"", North Carolina Museum of Art Bulletin, XI, 1973, no. 4, 20–31.
- "Hasidism and Elie Wiesel", Theology Today, XXX, no. 2, July 1973, 148–153.
- "Raphael's Reconstruction of the Throne of Gregory the Great", Art Bulletin, LV, 1973, 373–379.
- "Thomas Sully's "Washington's Passage of the Delaware": The History of a Commission", Art Bulletin, LV, 1973, 584–599.
- "The Account Book of Thomas Appleton of Livorno: A Document in the History of American Art, 1802–1825", Winterthur Portfolio, IX, 1974, 123–151.
- "Gods and Men on the Parthenon Frieze" (excerpts from "The Rocks on the Parthenon Frieze", 1961, reprinted with a foreword), The Parthenon, ed. Vincent J. Bruno (Norton Critical Studies in Art History). New York, 1974, 311–321.
- "Vasari's "Extirpation of the Huguenots": The Challenge of Pity and Fear", Gazette des Beaux-Arts, LXXXI, 1974, 257–283.
- "The Placement of the Equestrian Statue of Marcus Aurelius in the Middle Ages", Journal of the Warburg and Courtauld Institutes, XXXVII, 1974, 362–367.
- ""Die Bartholomäusnacht" von Giorgio Vasari: Gedanken über das Schreckliche in der Kunst", Mitteilungen der Technischen Universität Carola-Wilhelmina zu Braunschweig, IX, 1974, 71–87.
- "Saints, Donors and Columns in Titian's "Pesaro Madonna"", Renaissance Papers 1974 (Proceedings of the South Eastern Renaissance Conference, University of North Carolina). Chapel Hill, North Carolina, 1975, 61–85.
- "Science and Art", The Nature of Scientific Discovery, ed. Owen Gingerich. Washington, D.C., 1975, 485.
- "Raphael as Archaeologist", Archeological News, IV, 1975, nos. 2–3, 29–48.
- "Masks, False Gods and the Truth of Art: A Phantasy Biased in Favor of Reason", Creative Communicator, VI, no. 12, 1975, 8–10.
- "The Worship of Bacchus and Venus in Bellini's and Titian's "Bacchanals" for Alfonso d'Este", Studies in the History of Art, National Gallery of Art, Washington, D.C., VI, 1974, 37–87.
- "Bernini's STEMME for Urban VIII on the baldacchino in St. Peter's: a forgotten compliment", Burlington Magazine, LXVIII, 1976, 484–491.
- "Vasari e Stradano come panegiristi dei Medici: Osservazioni sul rapporto tra verità storica e verità poetica nella pittura di fatti storici", Il Vasari storiografo e artista: congresso internazionale nel IV centenario della morte, 1974, Istituto Nazionale di Studi sul Rinascimento, Florence. 1976, 207–224.
- "Turner's Classicism and the Problem of Periodization in History of Art", Critical Inquiry, III, no. 1, 1976, 93–129.
- "Ovidian Delight and Problems in Iconography" (with Paul Watson), Storia dell'Arte, XXVI, 1976, 23–30.
- "Patronage through the Ages", The Great Ideas Today, ed. Robert M. Hutchins and Mortimer Adler. Chicago, 1977, 74–90.
- Contribution to John W. Dixon, "A Hermeneutic of Narrative", a Colloquium, 1976, Colloquy 24, Center for Hermeneutical Studies, Berkeley, California, 1977, 27–30.
- "Ekphrasis or Iconology? The Case of the Neglected Cows in Titian's "Rape of Europa"", Actas del XXIII Congreso Internacional de Historia del Arte, Granada, 1977, II, 258–277.
- "Enlightenment: E. H. Gombrich's The Heritage of Apelles". Burlington Magazine, XXI, 1979, 178–181 (review article).
- "Farewell to Jokes: The last "Capricci" of Giovanni Domenico Tiepolo and the Tradition of Irony in Venetian Painting", Critical Inquiry, VI, 1979, 761–791.
- "Titian and the Olympian Gods: The Camerino of Philip II", Convegno di Studi: Tiziano e Venezia, Università degli Studi di Venezia, 1976. Venice, 1980, 139–147.
- "Life Beyond the Reach of Hope: Recollections of a Refugee, 1938–39", The College, St. John's College, Md., XXXI, no. 2, 1980, 32–39.
- ""The Rape of Europa" and Related Ovidian Pictures by Titian (Part I)", Fenway Court, 1979, Isabella Stewart Gardner Museum, Boston, 1980, 3–24.
- "Poetry and the Entry of the Fine Arts into England: UT PICTURA POESIS", The Age of Milton, ed. C. A. Patrides and Raymond B. Waddington. Manchester, England, 1980, 273–306.
- "The Decorum of Paolo Veronese: Notes on the "Marriage at Cana"", Art the Ape of Nature: Studies in Honor of H. W. Janson. New York, 1981, 341–365.
- "A Tomb in Rome by Harriet Hosmer: Notes on the Rejection of Gesture in the Rhetoric of Funerary Art", Essays in Honor of Jan Bialostocki: Ars Auro Prior". Warsaw, 1981, 639–649.
- ""The Rape of Europa" and Related Ovidian Pictures by Titian (Part II)", Fenway Court, 1980, Isabella Stewart Gardner Museum, Boston, 1981, 2–19.
- "Franciscus Junius and the Defense of Art", Artibus et Historiae, no. 3, II, 1981, 9–55.
- "Canova's Tomb and the Cult of Genius", Il Labirinto, I, no. 2, 1982, 46–67.
- "Beauty and the Historian of Art: Reflections on Titian's "Venus and Adonis"", Problemi di metodo: condizioni di esistenza di una storia dell'arte, ed. Layos Vayer (Comité International d'Histoire de l'Art, X). Bologna, 1982, 185–195.
- "The Naked Christ in Santa Maria Novella in Florence: Reflections on an Exhibition and the Consequences", Storia dell'Arte, XLV, 1982, 161–169.
- "Bernini's DECORO: some preliminary observations on the baldachin and his tombs in St. Peter's", Studies in Iconography, VII–VIII, 1981–82, 323–369 (with Chandler Kirwin).
- "Sculpture in St. Peter's, Rome: Function and the Exigencies of Display", Abstracts, XXV. Internationaler Kongress für Kunstgeschichte, Comité International d'Histoire de l'Art, Vienna, 1983, Arbeitsgruppe: Neue Forschungsergebnisse und Arbeitsvorhaben, Abstract no. 12.
- "Poetry and the Art of Raphael", Raphael and the Ruins of Rome: the Poetic Dimension. Exhibition catalogue, ed. Philipp Fehl and Stephen Prokopoff, Krannert Art Museum. Champaign, IL, 1983, 5–13.
- "Schönheit, Schicklichkeit und Ikonographie: Bemerkungen zur "Fontana delle Tartarughe" in Rom", Martin Gosebruch zu Ehren: Festschrift, ed. Frank N. Steigerwald. Munich, 1984, 126–137.
- "Painting and the Inquisition at Venice: Three Forgotten Files" (with Marilyn Perry), Interpretazioni Veneziane ... in onore di Michelangelo Muraro, ed. David Rosand. Venice, 1984, 371–381.
- "Vasari and the Arch of Constantine", Giorgio Vasari tra decorazione ambientale e storiografia artistica, ed. Gian Carlo Garafagnini. Florence, 1985, 27–44.
- "Improvisation and the Artist's responsibility in St. Peter's, Rome: Papal Tombs by Bernini and Canova", XXV. Internationaler Kongress für Kunstgeschichte, CIHA, Wien, Acts, IX. Vienna, 1985, 111–123, 199–204.
- "Feasting at the Table of the Lord: Pietro Aretino and the Hierarchy of Pleasures in Venetian Painting", Hebrew University Studies in Literature and the Arts, XIII, no. 2, 1985, 161–174.
- "Hermeticism and Art: Emblem and Allegory in the Work of Bernini", Artibus et Historiae, no. 14, VII, 1986, 153–189.
- "Death and the Artist's Fame: The AGENDA of Prominent Signatures on Papal Tombs in St. Peter's", Abstracts and Program Statements for Art History Sessions, 75th Annual Meeting of the College Art Association of America, Boston, 1987, 67.
- "Wagner's Anti-Semitism and the Dignity of Art", Wagner in Retrospect: A Centennial Reappraisal, ed. Leroy R. Shaw, et al. Amsterdam, 1987, 197–202.
- "L'umiltà cristiana e il monumento sontuoso: la tomba di Urbano VIII del Bernini", Gian Lorenzo Bernini e le arti visive, ed. Marcello Fagiolo. Rome, 1987, 185–208.
- "Imitation as a Source of Greatness: Rubens, Titian and the Painting of the Ancients", The Bacchanals by Titian and Rubens, ed. Görel Cavalli-Björkman, National Museum, Stockholm, 1987, 107–132.
- "The Capriccio in Prints", lead article in The Jest and Earnestness of Art, ed. Philipp P. Fehl and Stephen Prokopoff. Exhibition Catalogue, Krannert Art Museum, Champaign, IL, 1987, 2–12 and the section "Text and Images", with Judith Dundas, 32–36.
- "The "Stadttempel" of the Jews of Vienna: Childhood Recollections and History", Artibus et Historiae 17, IX, 1988 (in honor of Rachel Wischnitzer), 89–126.
- "The Ghost of Homer: Observations on Ruben's "Portrait of the Earl of Arundel"", Fenway Court, Isabella Stewart Gardner Museum, Boston, 1988, 7–24.
- "Art Lessons: Thoughts on Raphael and Wagner", ed. Charles R. Mack, Collections, I, no. 4, 1989, 7–11.
- "Verrocchio's Tomb of Piero and Giovanni de Medici: Ornament and the Language of Mourning", Italian Echoes in the Rocky Mountains, ed. Sante Matteo et al. Brigham Young University, Provo, Utah, 1990, 47–67.
- "Dürer's Signatures: The Artist as Witness", Continuum, I, no. 2, 1991, 3–34.
- "Begegnung mit dem Ursprung: Leopoldo Cicognara und die Erfindung der modernen Kunstgeschichte", Der Kunsthistoriker, Vienna, VIII, 1991, Sondernummer 6: Österreichischer Kunsthistorikertag, 22–29.
- "The French Revolution and the Origins of Modern Art History: The Contribution of Leopoldo Cicognara, Acts of the XVI. International Congress of Art History, Strasbourg, 1987. Strasbourg, 1992, 332–343.
- "Dürer's Literal Presence in his Pictures: Reflections on his Signatures in the "Small Woodcut Passion"", Der Künstler über sich in seinem Werk, ed. Matthias Winner. Acta humaniora, Weinheim, 1992, 191–244.
- "Eine Begegnung mit Albrecht Bloch", Kontinuität: Identität. Festschrift für Wilfried Skreiner, ed. Götz Pochat, Christa Steinle, Peter Weibel. Vienna, 1992, 227–240.
- "Meine Flucht vor den Deutschen, 1939" aus dem Englischen von Freia Hartung, Merkur, Deutsche Zeitschrift für europäisches Denken, Heft S 39 (?? 2001).
- "Dürer's Historiated Self-Portraits: "The Marrtyrdom of the Ten Thousand" and Related Works", lecture given at the Hebrew University (Mount Scopus) on 11.3.1992. (So far I have the announcement, must find the text).
- "Raphael as a Historian: Poetry and Historical Accuracy in the "Sala di Costantino"". Artibus et Historiae, no. 28, XIV, 1993, 9–76.
- "Dürer's Portrait of Erasmus and the Medal by Quentin Massys: Two Kinds of Mimesis", Künstlerischer Austausch: Artistic Exchange: Acts of the XXVIII International Congress of Art History, Berlin, 1992, ed. Thomas Gaethgens. Berlin, 1993, 453–471.
- "In Praise of Imitation: Leonardo and his Followers", Gazette des Beaux-Arts 137, CXXVI, 1995 (July–August), 1–12.
- "Über das Schreckliche in der Kunst: "Die Schindung des Marsyas" als Aufgabe", Apoll schindet Marsyas. Exhibition Catalogue, ed. Reinhold Baumstark, Peter Volk, Bayerisches Nationalmuseum, Munich, 1995, 49–91.
- "Begegnung im Grenzland: Zwei Freunde", Wilfried Skreiner. Texte, Fotos, Reaktionen: Eine Hommage. Graz–Vienna, 1995, 143–148.
- "Touchstones of Art and Art Criticism: Rubens and the Work of Franciscus Junius", The Humanities Lecture of 1984 at the University of Illinois at Urbana-Champaign, Journal of Aesthetic Education, XXX, no. 2, 1996, 5–24.
- "Restitution in Retrospect: Remembering Erik Sjöqvist", "Nobile Munus" Origine e Primi Sviluppi dell'Unione Internazionale degli Istituti di Archeologia, Storia e Storia dell'Arte in Roma (1946–1953). Per la storia della collaborazione internazionale a Roma nelle ricerche umanistiche nel secondo dopoguerra, Roma, 1996, 159–176.
- "Der Klucky-Tempel. Kindheitserinnerungen zur Architekturgeschichte", Merkur, 575, 1997.
- "Epilogue. On Virtue and Vice: Milton's "Pandemonium" and Bernini's Baldachin", Power Matchless: The Pontificate of Urban VIII. The Baldachin and Gian Lorenzo Bernini, ed. W. Chandler Kirwin. Peter Lang, New York, 1997, 235–252 [237].
- "Nostalgie und Kunstgeschichte: Der goldene Name Gottes auf dem Michaelerplatz in Wien," Sinn und Form, 49. Jahr (1997), 2. Heft, pp. 293–97.
- "Death and the Sculptor's Fame: Artist's Signatures on Renaissance Tombs in Rome", Biuletyn Historii Sztuki, LXI, 1997, 196–217.
- "Vasari e il Mosè di Michelangelo", introduction to Naomi Vogelman, Roma, Una Storia d'Amore. Introduzione al Mosè, Florence, 1997.
- "Kunstgeschichte und die Sehnsucht nach der hohen Kunst: Winckelmann, Fiorillo und Leopoldo Cicognara", Johann Dominicus Fiorillo. Kunstgeschichte und die romantische Bewegung um 1800, ed. A. M. Kosegarten. Göttingen, 1997, 450–476.
- "Das gezähmte Monster. Bemerkungen zum Gartenportal des Palazzo Zuccari in Rom: 'prudentia monstrorum domitrix'", Römisches Jahrbuch der Bibliotheca Hertziana 32, 1997/98, Beih., 265–293.
- "Franciscus Junius, Rubens and Van Dyck", Franciscus Junius and his Circle, ed. Rolf Bremmer. Amsterdam–Atlanta, 1998, 35–70.
- "Drei Ebenen von Platons Höhle: Wiederbegegnung mit Edgar Winds 'Art and Anarchy'", Egdar Wind. Kunsthistoriker und Philosoph, ed. H. Bredekamp, B. Buschendorf, F. Hartung, J. M. Krois. Berlin, 1998, 135–177.
- "The Dedication Copy of Leopoldo Cicognara's Catalogo Ragionato of 1821 (B.A.V., Riserva IV. 169) and the Fondo Cicognara at the Vatican Library. Thoughts on a Legacy", with Maria Raina Fehl, Miscellanea Bibliothecae Vaticanae Apostolicae VI, Collectanea in honorem Rev.mi Patris Leonardi E. Boyle Septuagesimum quintum annum feliciter complentis. Città del Vaticano, 1998, 173–209.
- "Van Dyck's moral grace: Antwerp and the classics", Ars longa. Prace dedykowane pamieci profesora Jana Bialostockiego: materially sesji Stowarzyszenia Historyków Sztuki, ed. M. Porprzecka. Warszawa, 1999, 295–331.
- "The Fondo Cicognara in the Vatican Library: Inventing the Art Library of the Future", Memory and Oblivion: Proceedings of the XXIXth International Congress of the History of Art held in Amsterdam, 1–7 September 1996, Dordrecht, 1999, 43–56.
- "Stendhal and Leopoldo Cicognara, Notes on the Strategy and the Truth of Stendhal's Lies", Gazette des Beaux-Arts 141, CXXXIV, 1999, 93–116.
- "Michelangelos Decke der Sixtinischen Kapelle als Ornament: Rahmen und Inhalt", In Erinnerung an Fabrizio Mancinelli. Die Rhetorik des Ornaments, ed. Isabelle Frank, Freia Hartung (aus dem Englischen von Jürgen Blasius). Wilhelm Fink Verlag, München, 2001, 35–37.
- "Life Beyond the Reach of Hope: Recollections of a Refugee, 1938–39. With a Postscript on Hope and the Humanities: Recollections of an art historian", Exile and Displacement, ed. Lauren Enzie. Peter Lang, New York, 2001.
- "Michelangelo's Tomb in Rome: Observations on the "Pietà" in Florence and the "Rondanini Pietà". Artibus et Historiae. No. 45, 2002, 9–26.
- ""Der Heilige Stephan und Michelangelos "Bekehrung des Heiligen Paul"" Wiener Jahrbuch für Kunstgeschichte, LII, 2002, pp. 47-66. [Philipp read the paper in Vienna 1998.]
- "Colossal Sculpture and the Light of God: Remarks on Michelangelo's Tomb of Julius II." (CAA, New York, 1990 ??)
- "Michelangelo's Decorum and the Grotesque.", paper first presented at the 22nd International Medieval Congress held under the auspices of the Medieval Institute of Western Michigan University, May, 1987. The expanded version was read in homage of John W. Dixon, September, 1987, in Chapel Hill, NC. The paper must still be better restored. It was badly garbled by the software. Raina Fehl added a section of this paper as an appendix to Monuments and the Art of Mourning: The Tombs of Popes and Princes in St. Peter's.
- "Virtù and Truth: Arundel state Portraits by Rubens and Van Dyck", paper read for the Society of Art History and Archaeology, University of Illinois, September 14, 1995.
- "Piety and the Conspicuous Monument: Michelangelo's Tomb of Julius II", unpublished lecture, certainly no later than 15 May 1984. It was likely read at the meetings of that year of the International Medieval Society in Kalamazoo, MI. Philipp re-used the first part of this essay, with its title, "Prelude macabre" in his essay "L'umiltà cristiana e il monumento sontuoso: la tomba di Urbano VIII del Bernini" and Raina Fehl adopted a part of it in "Monuments and the Art of Mourning: The Tombs of Popes and Princes in St. Peter's".
- Paper read May, 1986, 21st Int. Congress on Medieval Studies, Kalamazoo, MI., "More Modest than Thou: Complexities of Decorum in Christian Funerary Sculpture"
- Bernini's Project of a Funerary Chapel for the Popes of the Future, final version dated by Philipp February, 1990. Philipp read it first at the conference held by the Canadian Institute in Rome in honor of Richard Krautheimer and Leonard Boyle. Philipp worked out the architectural possibilities with Kasimir and Maria Piechotka and the drawings to scale are by them, working out Philipp's ideas. The paper but only two of the illustrations is included as an appendix to Monuments and the Art of Mourning: The Tombs of Popes and Princes in St. Peter's.
- "Laudatio Naomi Vogelman" read 15, April, 1999, in Rome on the occasion of the presentation of her Roma, Una storia d'amore. Introduzione al Mosè, Firenze, 1997, con prefazione di Philipp Fehl, "Vasari e il "Mosè" di Michelangelo" (unpublished).

=== Tapes for the Blind ===
- Art and the Imagination: An Introduction to the Poetry of Renaissance Painting for the Particular Pleasure of the Blind, a series of twelve tape recordings (conversations). Twelve radio broadcasts, edited by Goddard Graves. One set of tapes were deposited and were to be available for use in the Media Center of the Library of the University of Illinois at Urbana-Champaign (Undergraduate Library), another in the Department of Education of the Krannert Museum of the University of Illinois. Neither seems extant in 2007. Goddard has a set.

=== Entries in Encyclopedias ===
- "Paolo Veronese", New Catholic Encyclopedia, New York, 1967, XIV, 623–625.
- "Monument", "Triumphal Arch", Oxford Companion to Art, Oxford, 1971, 623–625, 737–738.
- "Antonio Correggio", "Lorenzo Lotto", "Jacopo Tintoretto", "Paolo Veronese", The McGraw-Hill Encyclopedia of World Biography, New York, 1973, III, 145–147; VI, 572–573; X, 449–452; XI, 126–128.
- "Belvedere Apollo", "Junius (Du Jou), Franciscus, the younger (1591–1677)", An Encyclopedia of the History of Classical Archaeology, ed. Nancy Thomson De Grummond, Fitzroy Dearborn Publishers, London–Chicago, 1996, I, 143–146 and 625–627.

=== Book reviews ===
In : College Art Journal, Art Digest, Journal of Aesthetics and Art Criticism, Renaissance Quarterly.

== See also ==
- Raina Fehl
- San Gregorio Magno al Celio
