= Paul Eisler =

Austrian inventor

- Paul Eisler with the first radio set using a printed circuit chassis and aerial coil (photo: Maurice Hubert, Multitech UK)
- Born: 3 August 1907; Vienna, Austria-Hungary
- Died: 26 October 1992 (85 years); London
- Education: Vienna University of Technology
- Scientific career
- Fields: Electrical engineering
- Workplaces: Technograph

Paul Eisler (3 August 1907 – 26 October 1992) was an Austrian inventor born in Vienna. Among his innovations were the printed circuit board. In 2012, Printed Circuit Design & Fab magazine named its Hall of Fame after Eisler.

== Early life and education ==
Paul Eisler was the son of Wilhelm Eisler, who was born in today's Slovakia, and Caecilie Eisler from Bohemia. He studied mechanical engineering at Vienna University of Technology and graduated in 1930. Being Jewish, antisemitic German-Nationalist organizations prevented him from getting an engineering job in Vienna, so he obtained employment with the British Gramophone Company, operating in Belgrade. His task there was to eliminate radio interference on the music broadcast system on trains running from Belgrade to Niś. The project was a technical success but a financial failure because the Serbian railroad could only pay the Gramophone Company by barter in grain, not pounds sterling, due a foreign exchange crisis. As a result, he had to return to Vienna. He was still prevented from working as an engineer, but he found work as a journalist and printer, first at Randfunk (which developed a low-cost method of tabulating a radio program guide at the printer) and eventually landing at a social-democratic publisher, Vorwärts. The experience in printing proved crucial later. However, after the 1934 putsch by Austrian fascists and due to social-democratic nature of Vorwärts it was shut down. Working independently, he patented some ideas from his doctorate at the university (on graphical sound recording and stereoscopic television) and leveraged them to obtain a visa to visit England to offer the patents to companies there in 1936. His first cousin, Philipp Fehl, contacted Eisler upon arrival as a refugee in England and Eisler helped to make sure that Fehl's father left Vienna alive after his release from the Dachau concentration camp.

== Inventions ==
Living in a Hampstead boarding house, without work or a work permit, he began to fabricate a radio using a printed circuit board while trying to sell some of his ideas. Around this time, the Odeon hired him to work on their cinema technology. One of the common problems there was coping with theatre goers who spilled foods such as ice cream on the seats. Eisler devised a yellow fabric to cover affected furniture for the benefit of the next theater goer as well as flag it for removal and cleaning at the next opportunity.

Though he was able to help several members of his family escape Austria, he was subject to internment by the British as an enemy alien after the onset of World War II. After being released in 1941 and a short spell in the Pioneer Corps, he was able to engage Henderson and Spalding, a lithography company in Camberwell run by Harold Vezey-Strong, to invest in his printed circuit idea via a specially created subsidiary of Henderson and Spalding called Technograph, but forfeited rights to his invention when he neglected to read the contract before signing it. It was a pretty standard employment contract in that he agreed to submit any patent right during his employment for a nominal fee (one pound sterling) but it also gave him 16.5 per cent ownership of Technograph. It drew no interest until the United States incorporated the technology into work on the proximity fuze which was vital to counter the German V-1 flying bomb. However, he did manage to obtain his first three printed circuit patent for a wide range of applications. They were split out from a single application submitted in 1943 and finally published after long legal procedures on 21 June 1950.

After the war ended, the United States opened access to his printed circuit innovation and since 1948, it has been used in all airborne instrument electronics. Very few companies acknowledged or licensed Technograph's patents and the company had financial difficulties. He resigned from Technograph in 1957. Among his projects as a freelancer, were films to heat "floor and wall coverings" and food, for example, fish fingers. The wallpaper idea was viable, but interest waned after the advent of cheaper energy resources with the discovery of natural gas in the North Sea.

Eisler invented many other practical applications of heating technology, such as the pizza warmer and rear window defroster, but was not so successful in their commercialization.

In 1963, Technograph lost a lawsuit against Bendix over most of the claims in the US versions of patents.

== Honours ==
He was awarded the Pour le Mérite by the French government. The Institute of Electrical Engineers awarded him the Nuffield Silver medal.

== Bibliography ==
- Medawar, Jean; Pyke, David (2012). Hitler's Gift : The True Story of the Scientists Expelled by the Nazi Regime (Paperback). New York: Arcade Publishing. ISBN 978-1-61145-709-4.
