= Alfredo Bianchini =

Italian politician (1940–2025)

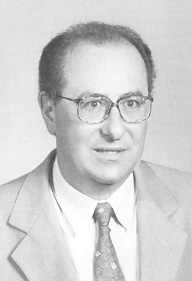
- Bianchini in 1992

Member of the Chamber of Deputies of Italy for Venice
- In office 21 April 1992 – 14 April 1994

Personal details
- Born: 12 April 1940; Venice, Italy
- Died: 3 April 2025 (aged 84); Venice, Italy
- Political party: PRI
- Occupation: Lawyer

Alfredo Bianchini (12 April 1940 – 3 April 2025) was an Italian lawyer and politician. A member of the Italian Republican Party, he served in the Chamber of Deputies from 1992 to 1994.

Bianchini died in Venice on 3 April 2025, at the age of 84.
