= Raina Fehl =

Austrian-American art historian (1920–2009)

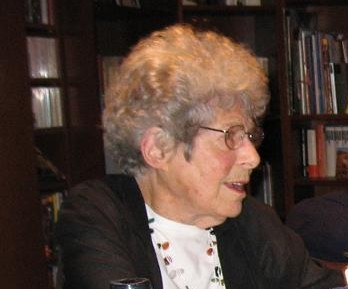
- Fehl in Rome 2008
- Born: Maria Raina Leonora Ruth Schweinburg; August 23, 1920; Vienna, Austria
- Died: May 3, 2009 (aged 88); Appleton, Wisconsin
- Resting place: Eternal Home Cemetery Colma California
- Occupations: Classicist, Writer, Editor
- Spouse: Philipp Fehl
- Children: 2
- Writing career
- Subject: Jewish Monuments
- Website: rainafehl.com

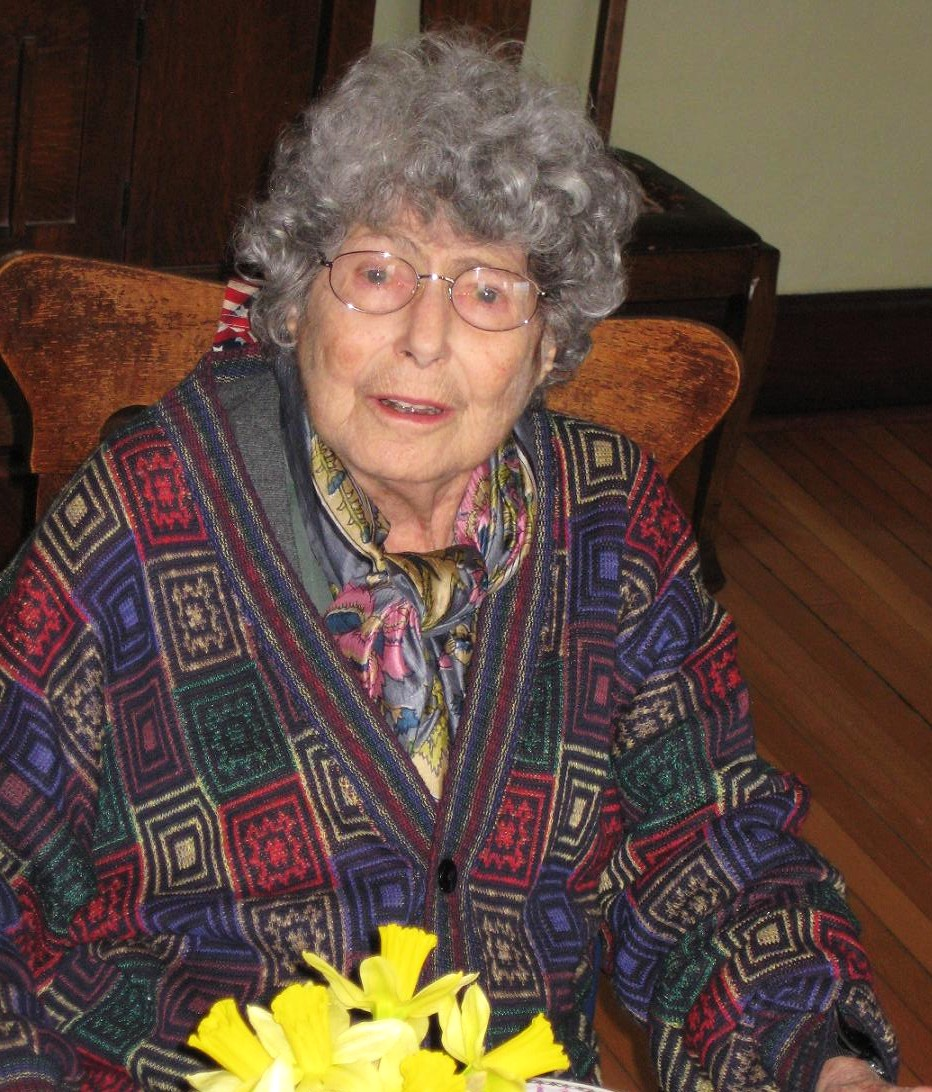
Fehl visiting in Wisconsin 2009 shortly before her death

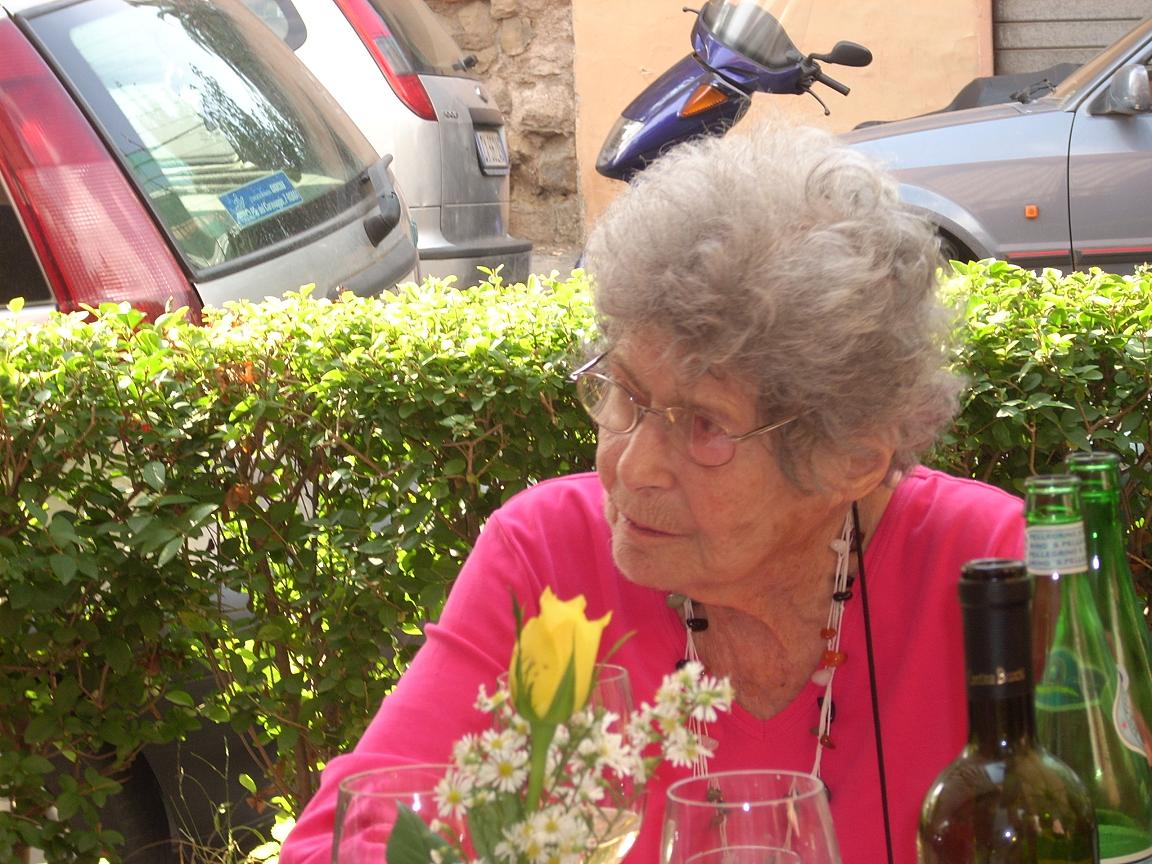
Fehl at the Cortille Restaurant on the Gianicolo, Rome, November 2008

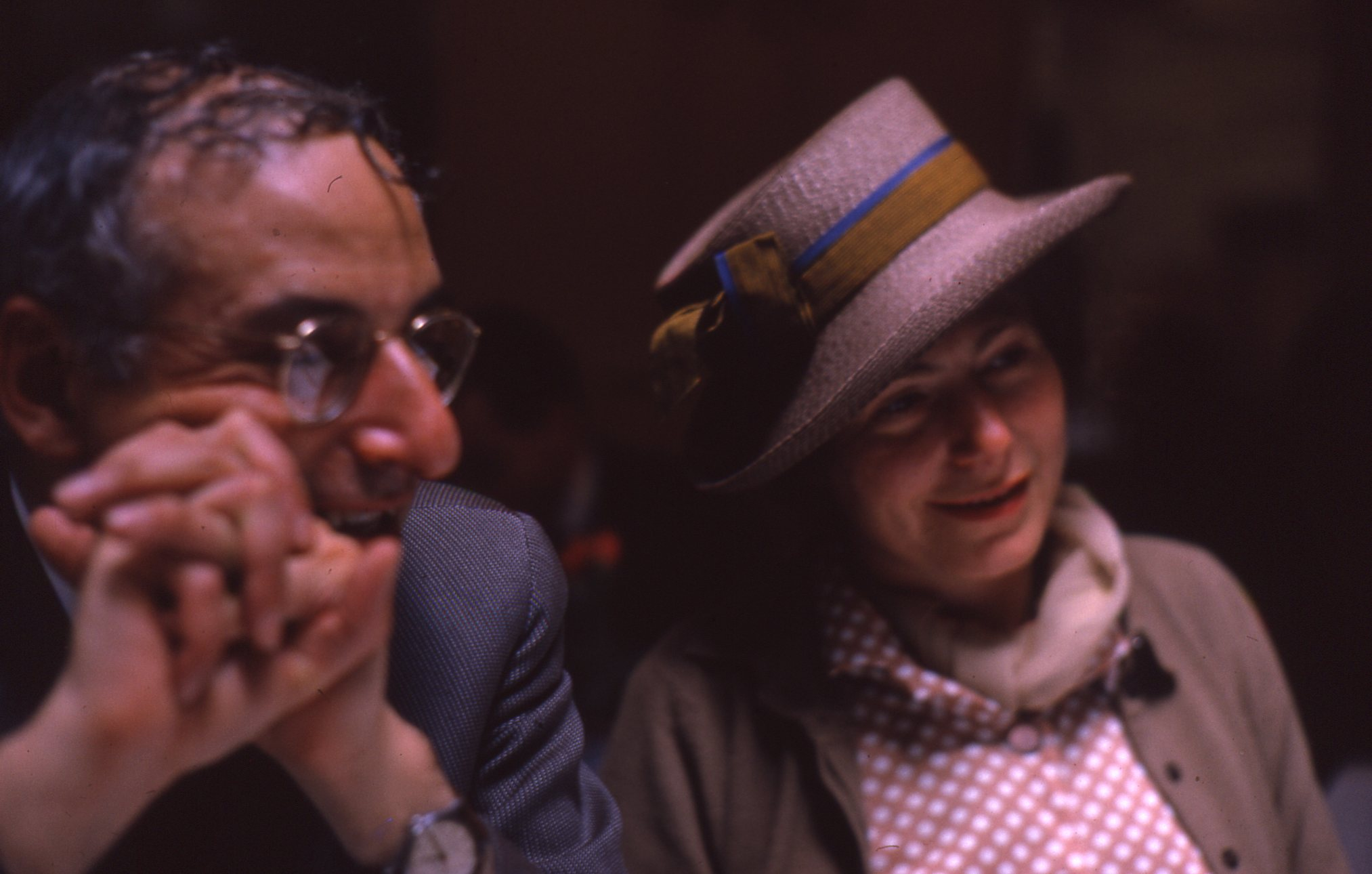
Raina and Philipp Fehl at Bertorelli's Restaurant, London in the early 1960s

Maria Raina Leonora Ruth Schweinburg (August 23, 1920 – May 3, 2009) was an Austrian-born American classicist, writer and editor. She was a research analyst on the Nuremberg War Crimes Trials, as well as co-founding the International Survey of Jewish Monuments along with her husband, Philipp Fehl.

She died May 3, 2009 in Appleton, Wisconsin and was buried near family in Colma, California.

== Biography ==
Raina Fehl was born to humanitarian Rosa Gussman Schweinburg and poet, author, and civil rights attorney Erich Fritz Schweinburg.

In 1939, she immigrated to the United States where she later became a citizen in 1944. She served in the U.S. Army Service from 1945 to 1946 while studying English, where she was involved as a Psychiatric Social Worker in the U.S. War Department. During this, she married Philipp Fehl on December 11, 1945. After this, she was a research analyst in the Nuremberg War Crimes Trials from 1946 until 1947.

In 1977, she, along with Philipp, co-founded the International Survey of Jewish Monuments of which they were co-presidents of. Together with her husband, Philipp Fehl, she worked in the Sala Cicognara in the Biblioteka Vaticana in the Vatican City. In October 2000 she became the Director of the Cicognara Project.

She had two daughters, Katharine Fehl, and Caroline Coulston.

== Education ==
- Wenzgasse Gymnasium, Vienna, Austria, Matura 1938
- New Jersey College for Women, Rutgers, 1939–1942, B.A. (history and English)
- Stanford University, 1947-1948 (German researching and writing on Karl Kraus)
- University of Chicago 1948–1952 (German philosophy)
- University of Nebraska, 1954–1962
- University of North Carolina at Chapel Hill, 1962-1967 (classics)
- University of Illinois, Urbana, M.A., 1976 (classics)

== Career ==
=== Teaching ===
- Between 1947 and 1952, she was a German Instructor at the University of Chicago
- Between 1954 and 1962, English and Latin Instructor at the University of Nebraska, Lincoln, Nebraska
- Between 1965 and 1969, she was a German instructor again, this time at the North Carolina School of the Arts, Winston-Salem
- Visiting Appointments at Tel Aviv University, in winter, 1982; and at the Hebrew University, Jerusalem, in spring, 1992

=== Offices ===
- International Survey of Jewish Monuments, vice-president, 1977–2000
- Editor, The Cicognara Newsletter, published by the Leopoldo Cicognara Project at the University of Illinois Library, Vatican Library, Vatican City, 1992–2009
- Director, The Leopoldo Cicognara Project at the University of Illinois Library, Vatican Library, Vatican City, dedicated to the study and promulgation of literary sources in the history of art, 2000–2009

=== Membership in learned societies ===
- College of Art Association of America
- International Survey of Jewish Monuments

== Scholarly work ==
- Franciscus Junius (the younger), The Literature of Classical Art
  - I. The Painting of the Ancients, London, 1638.
  - II. Catalogus Architectorum, Mechanicorum sed praecipue A critical edition and translation by Keith Aldrich, Philipp Fehl and Raina Fehl, University of California Press, Berkeley, California 192.
- Catalogo ragionao dei libri d'arte e d'antichita posseduti dal Conte Cocognara (Vatican Press, 2001). A critical edition of the 1821 imprint published in Pisa. Co-editor with Philipp P. Fehl and Maria Raina Fehl.

III. Editor, The Art of Mourning, Philipp P. Fehl. Collections

- The Cicognara Library: Literary Sources in the History of Art and Kindred Subjects (Leopoldo Cicognara Program at the University of Illinois Library in Association with the Vatican Library, Vatican City, 1989–2009.

Microfiche collection of ca 5,000 titles. Co-editor with Philipp P. Fehl. Books

- Jewish Heritage Report, Vol.II, Nos. 1-2 / Spring-Summer 1998, Stein und Name, Review.
- The literature of classical art / Franciscus Junius; edited by Keith Aldrich, Philipp Fehl, Raina Fehl

== Unpublished modern fiction ==
After Raina Fehl's death, a notebook with the words "Don't Lose Me" written on the cover was discovered by her daughters which contained short stories written by her. Plans were made to transcribe and publish this text.
