= Antonio Zona =

Italian painter (1814–1892)

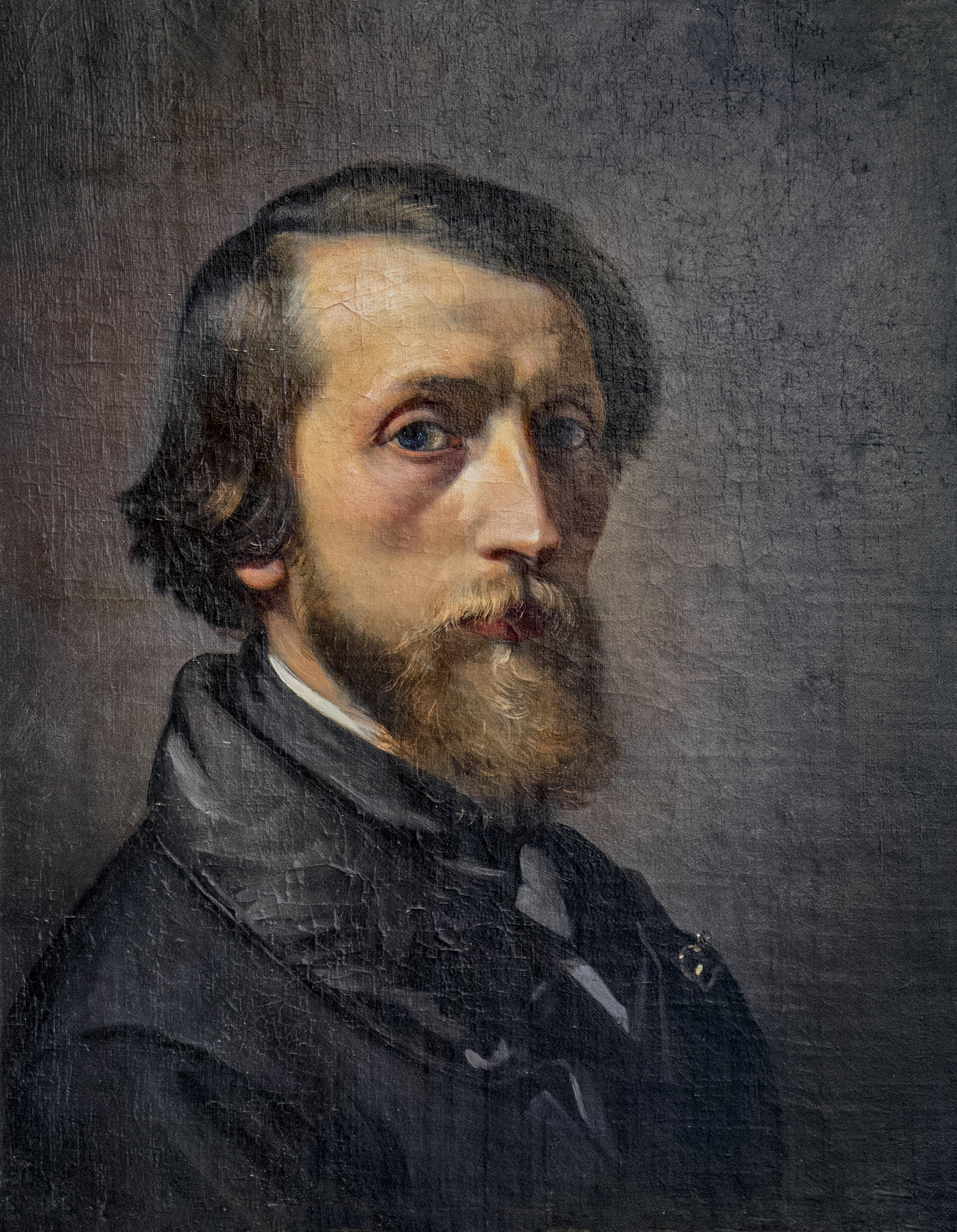
Antonio Zona (Self Portrait)

Antonio Zona (1814 – February 1, 1892) was an Italian painter, active in a style fusing Neoclassicism and Romantic style.

== Biography ==
He was born in Gambarare, a neighborhood of Mira. He attended the Royal Academy of Fine Arts in Venice, where he studied under Ludovico Lipparini One of his colleagues was Pompeo Marino Molmenti. With the decline of neoclassicism, the Academy was in ferment over changing styles of painting. In Venice, Zona befriended the followers of the Scapigliatura lifestyle, Bartolomeo Granelli and Ippolito Caffi, frequenting the same caffè Calcina on the Zattere. Among Zona's mentors and teachers over the following years were Odorico Politi, Michelangelo Grigoletti, and Pietro Selvatico. In 1857, he had accepted a commission by the Austrian Monarch Franz Joseph for a canvas depicting the Encounter of Titian and Veronese at the Ponte della Paglia (Galleria della Accademia). The painting was praised for its evocation of the style of Titian.

In 1859, Zona declined his next major commission, by Prince Maximilian, for a canvas titled L’ingresso degli austriaci a Venezia. By 1860, he had moved to Milan for some years, and instead painted some canvases with a patriotic theme, including Venezia che desolata abbraccia la liberata Milano (1860) and Un canto funebre (1862 and alluding to the funeral of Count Cavour). These paintings were less well received, for example by Pompeo Molmenti in 1903, because they were deemed to be echoing antique styles. A new era in Italy was felt to require a new style.

Zona returned to Venice for most of his life. He was eclectic, painting genre, history, landscapes and portraits in oil and watercolor. For the Camera dei Deputati, he painted a portrait of King Umberto in 1880; he also painted a portrait of honorable Giovanni Battista Vare, and in 1883 exhibited at Milan a portrait of a young lady. Among his landscapes was a Il tramonto dalla Villa Medici in Rome and a large number of vedute of Venice and other places in Italy. He also painted an Ophelia exhibited in 1884 at Turin; and Maria la simpatica, a peasant girl, exhibited in 1881 at Milan. Lo Zona was knighted and official of the Order of Santi Maurizio e Lazzaro.

Zona died in Rome on February 1, 1892.
