= Ippolito Caffi =

Italian painter

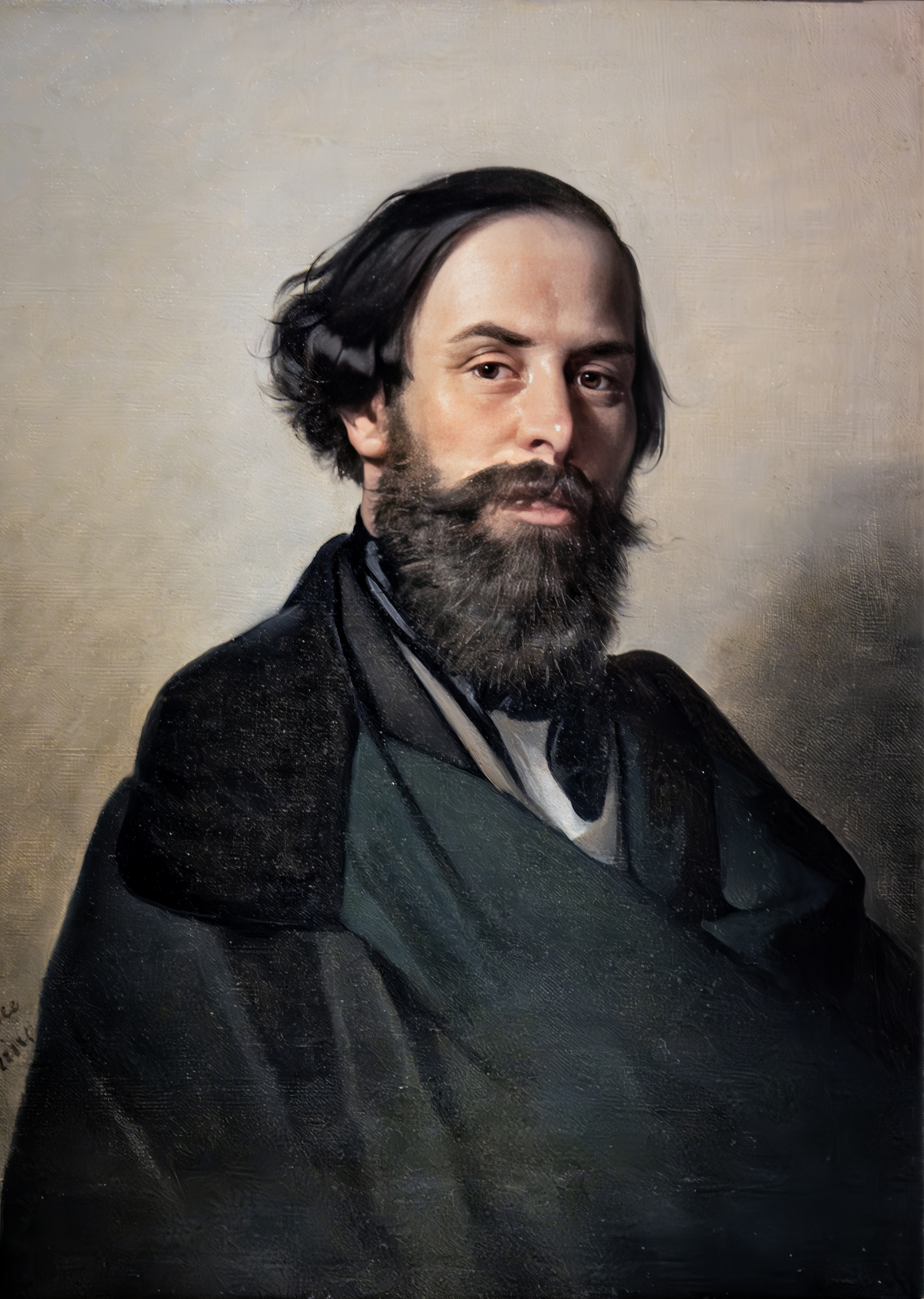
- Self portrait, Pinacoteca Querini Stampalia, Venice
- Born: 16 October 1809; Belluno, Kingdom of Italy
- Died: 20 July 1866 (aged 56); Lissa, Kingdom of Italy
- Known for: Painting
- Movement: Romanticism

Ippolito Caffi (16 October 1809 – 20 July 1866) was an Italian painter of architectural subjects and seascapes or urban vedute.

== Biography ==
=== Early life and education ===
Ippolito Caffi was born at Belluno on 16 October 1809. After training initially in Belluno (1821–5), then in Padua with his cousin Pietro Paoletti, Caffi attended the Accademia di Belle Arti di Venezia (1827–31), studying under Teodoro Matteini, Francesco Bagnara and Tranquillo Orsi. By 1830, he had won awards for his vedute at the academy. In 1832 he moved to Rome, acquiring immediate fame as a vedutista. He displayed a virtuoso command of spatial construction; in 1835 he published a textbook on perspective, Lezioni di prospettiva pratica, with Antonio Bianchini.

=== Career ===
Caffi modernized the veduta vocabulary inherited from Canaletto, selecting new points of view, and he showed an interest in nocturnal scenes with artificial or lunar illumination, in recording the effects of light and atmosphere at particular times, and in chronicling unusual events such as eclipses and balloon flights. His most famous work, the Last Hour of Carnevale in Rome (The Candles) (1837; Venice, Ca' Pesaro), displays the originality of his style. Rome appears as an illusionistically vast stage on which human figures are simply sparks of light and patches of vivid colour. Exhibited in Venice, it met with enormous success; Caffi executed 42 replicas, a practice he adopted for other popular subjects.

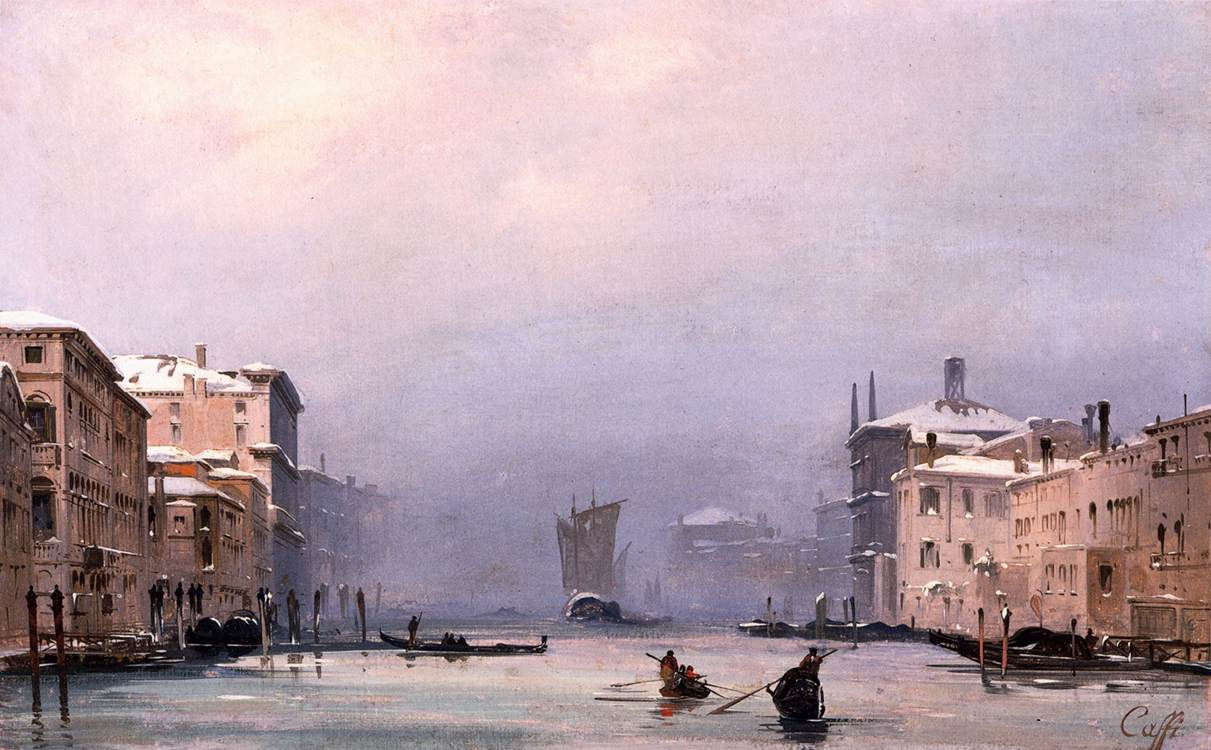
Snow and Fog on the Grand Canal (1840)

The first work of his that created a sensation was Carnival at Venice. This was exhibited at Paris in 1846, and was admired for its brilliant effects of light. Veiled light and heavy atmosphere are the main elements of Venice in the Snow (1850; Trieste, Revoltella Museum). Caffi travelled extensively in Italy, the Orient (1843–4) and around Europe (1850s), recording his experiences in numerous sketches. Extremely prolific, he received many commissions for paintings and frescoes throughout Italy. A fervent patriot, he painted many episodes of the Risorgimento (e.g. the Arrival of Victor Emanuel II in Naples, 1860–61; Venice, Ca’ Pesaro; large version, Turin, Museo Nazionale del Risorgimento Italiano). He joined revolutionary movements in Venice in 1848, and had to retire into Piedmont. His aim of commemorating in paint the first Italian naval engagement was frustrated when the Re d'Italia, on which he travelled, was destroyed on 20 July 1866 by the Imperial Austrian Navy at the battle of Lissa, drowning him along with his comrades.

In 2005–2006, an exhibition on Ippolito Caffi was held in his native Belluno.

== Gallery ==
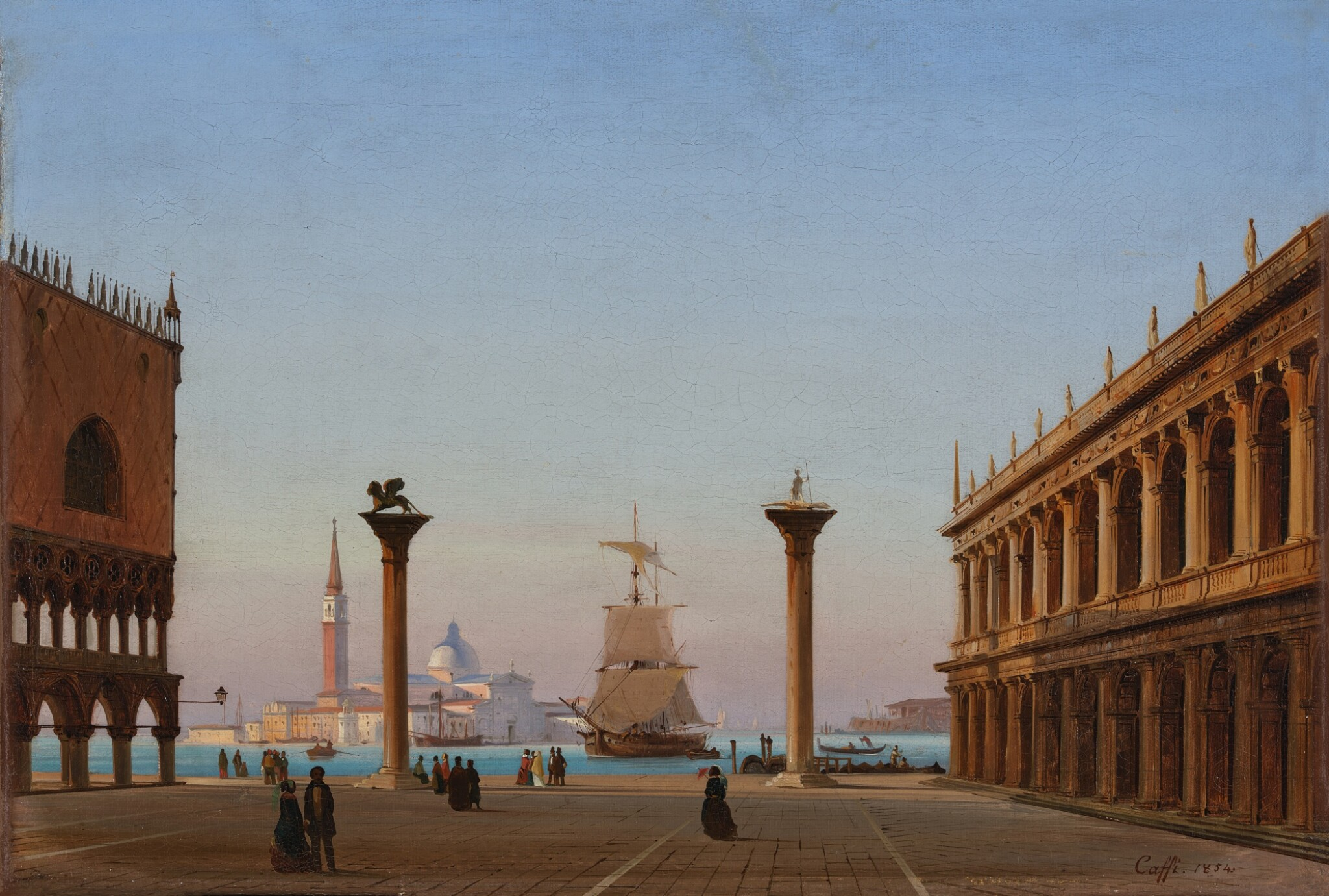
View of the Piazzetta with the Columns of Saints Mark and Todaro

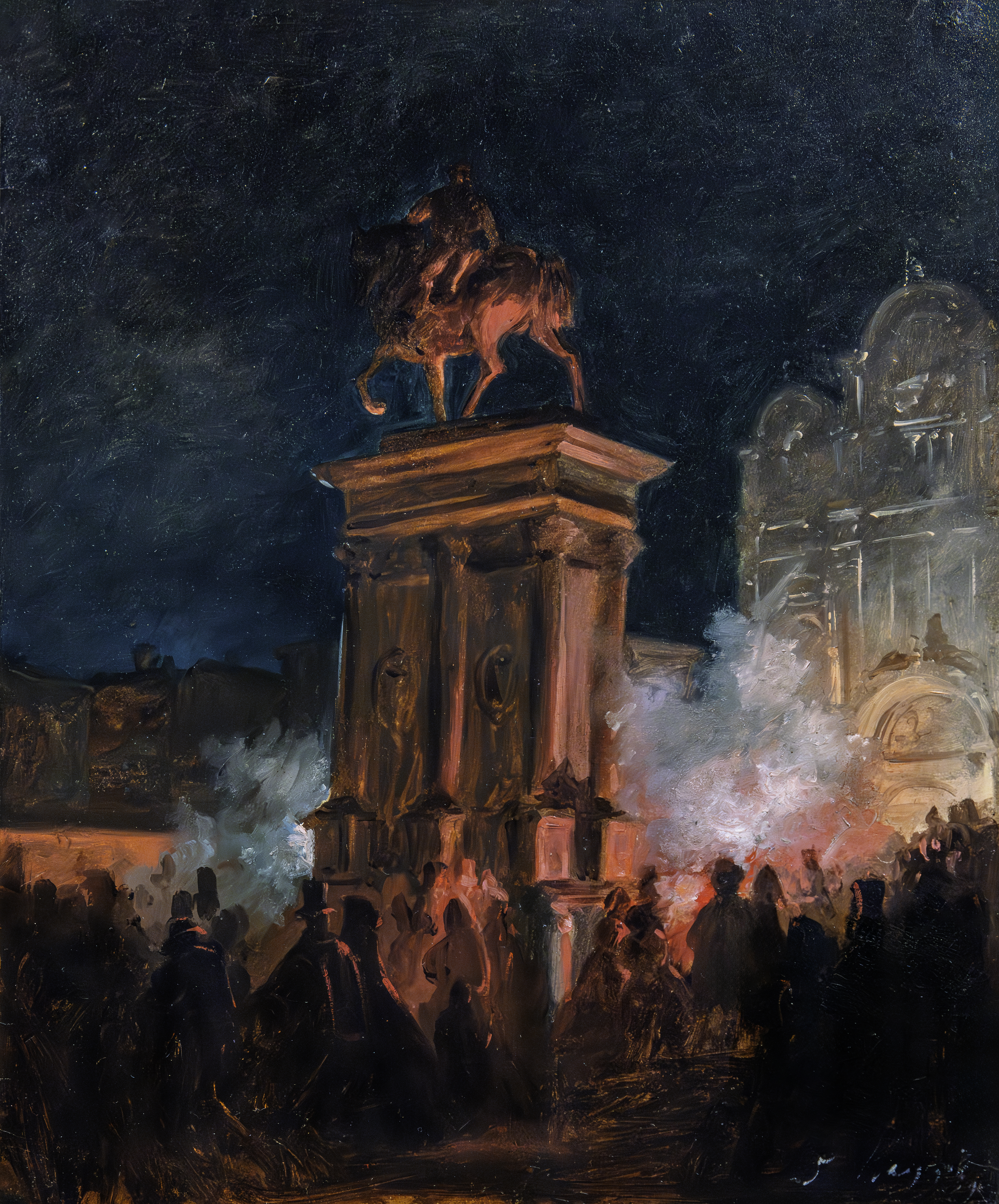
Night party with fireworks
1850
Musée Luigi Bailo in Treviso

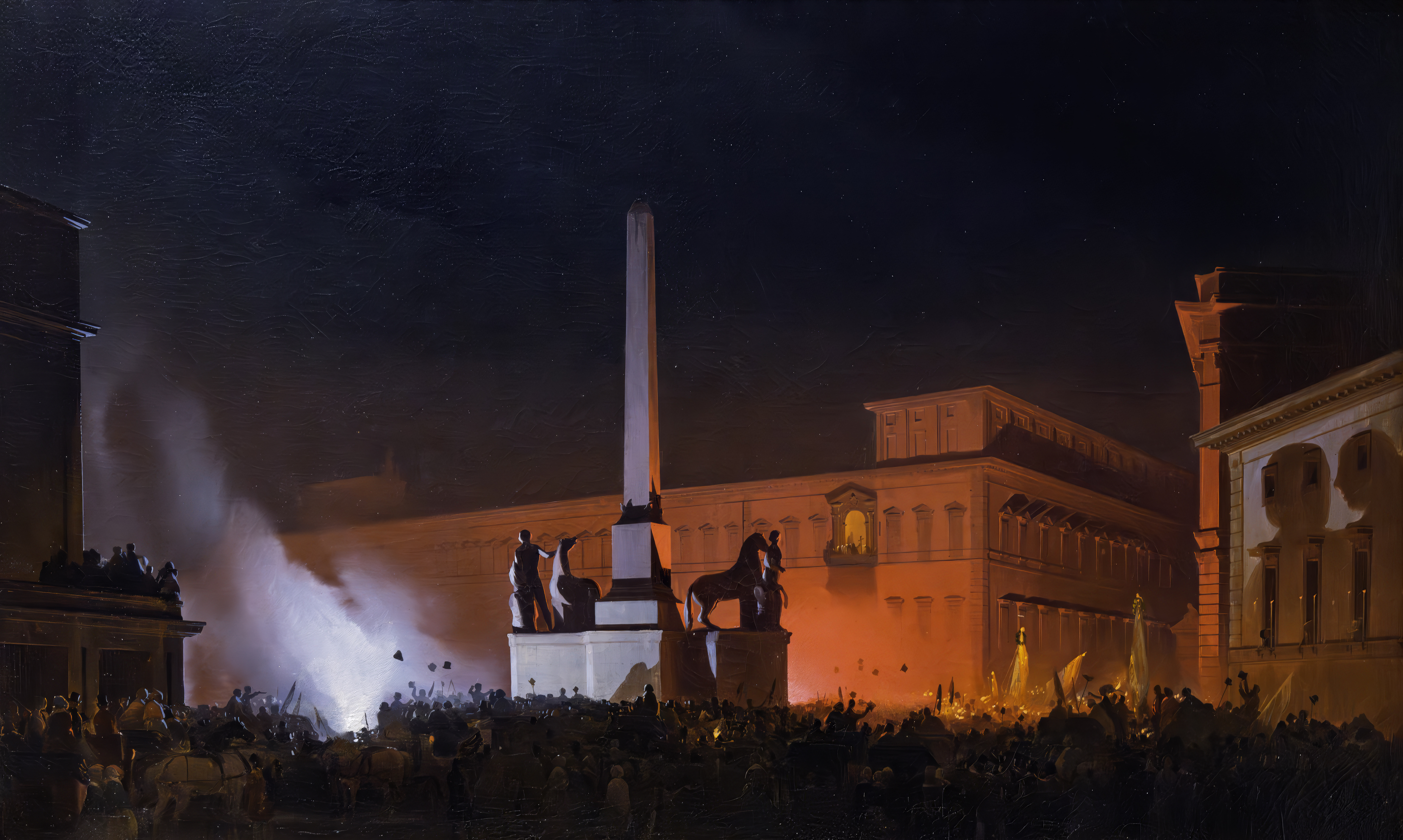
Blessing of Pius IX from the Quirinale at Night 1848
Musée Luigi Bailo in Treviso

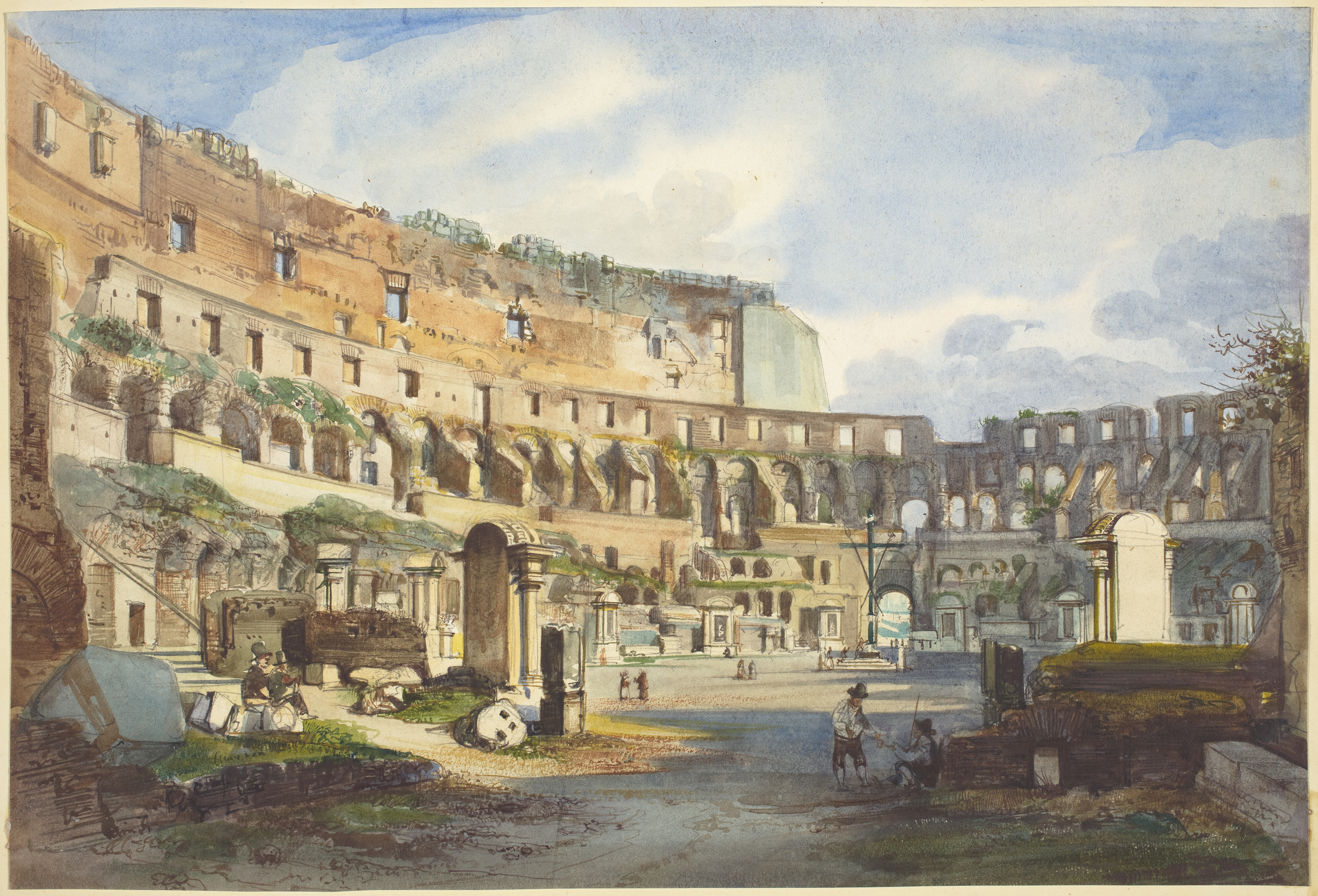
Interior of the Colosseum

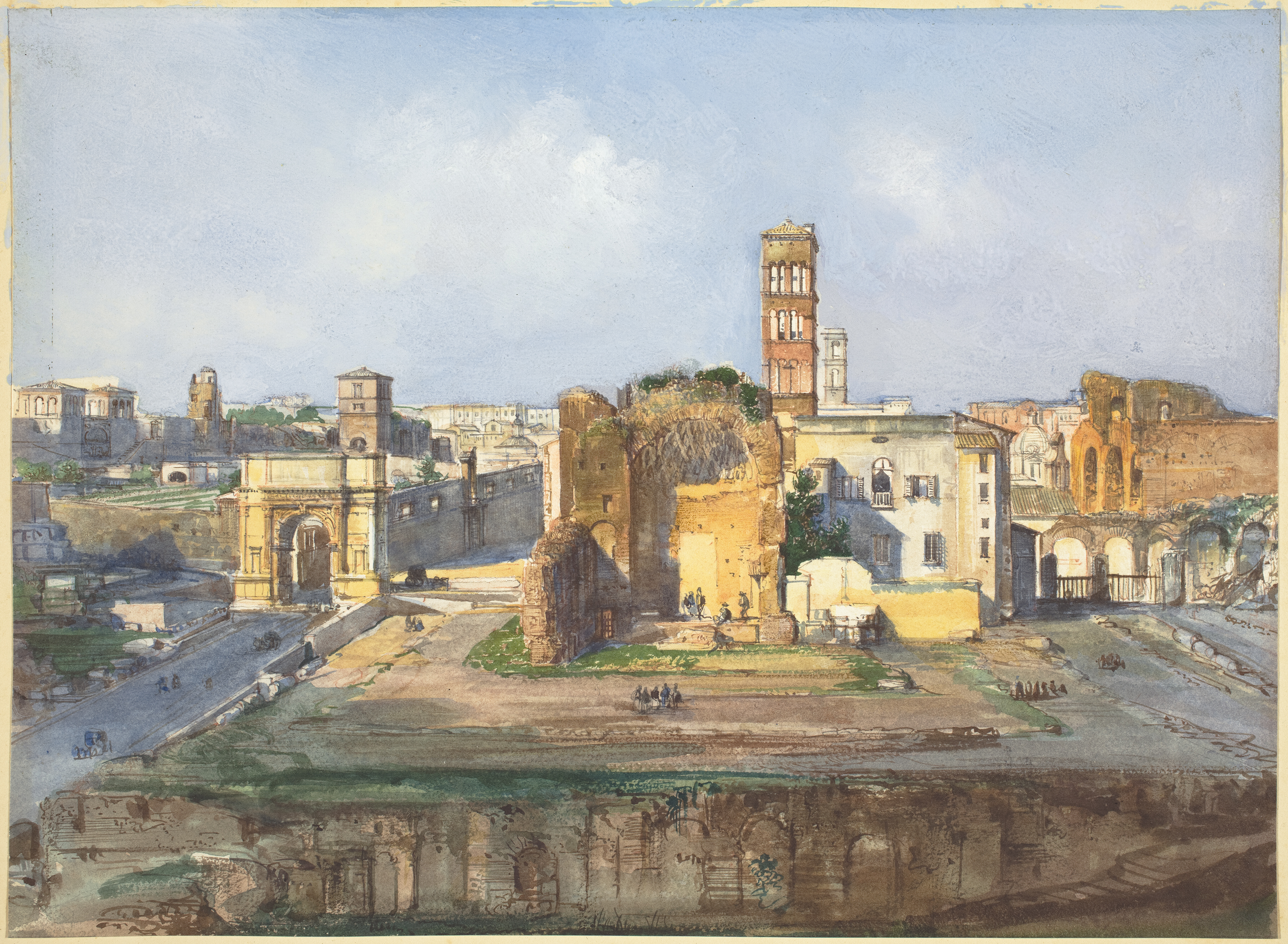
The Arch of Titus and the Temple of Venus and Rome near the Roman Forum

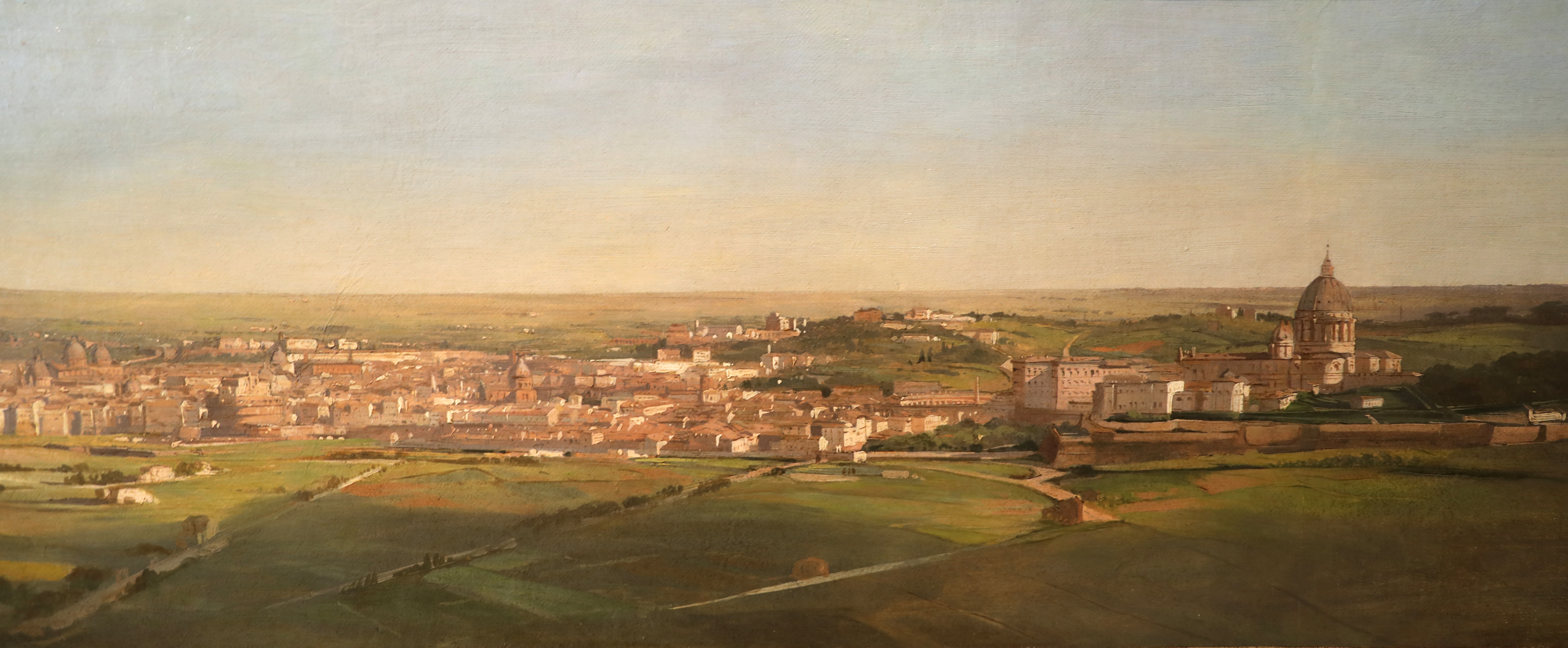
View of Roma

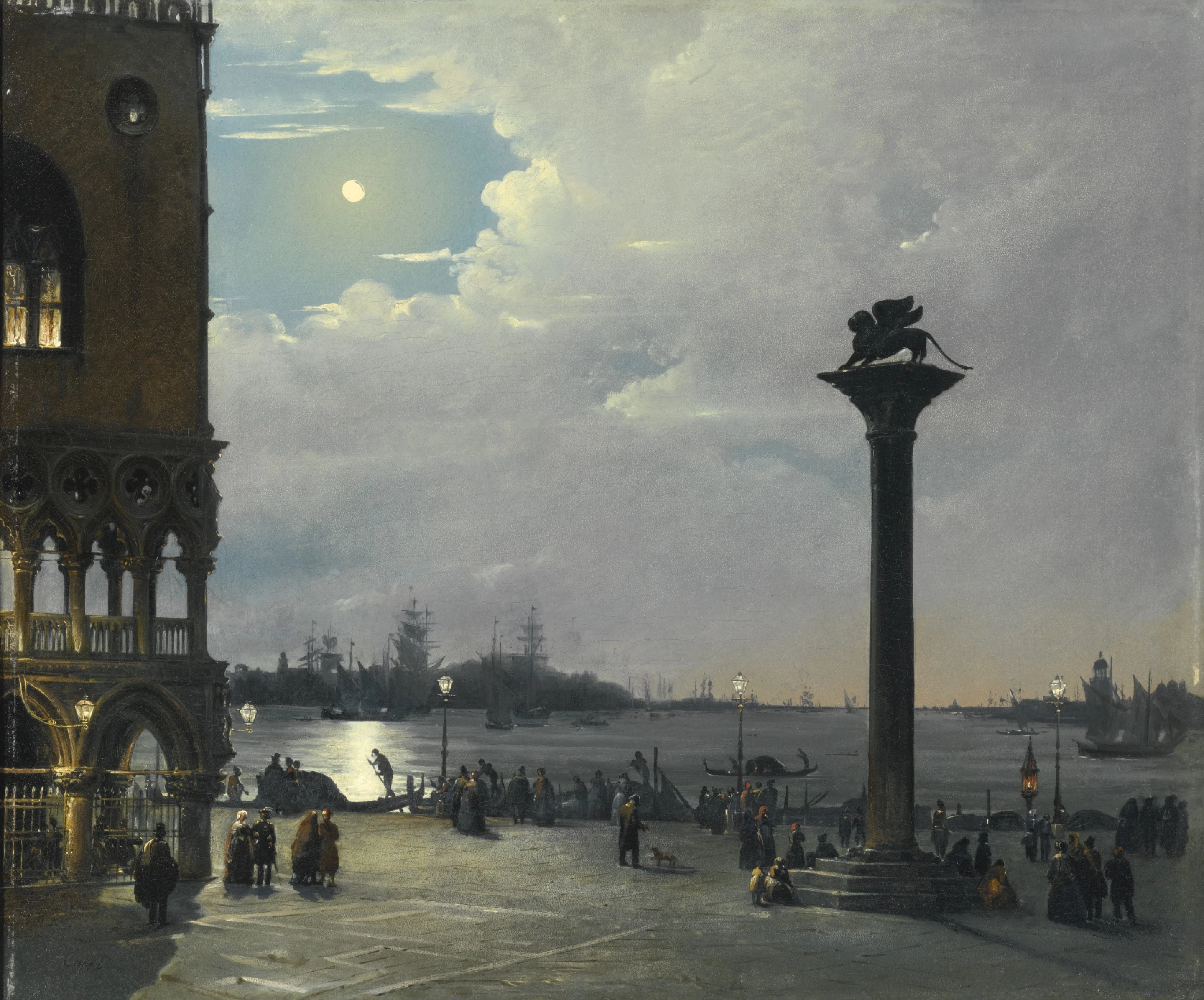
Nocturnal view of Piazza San Marco with the Ducal Palace

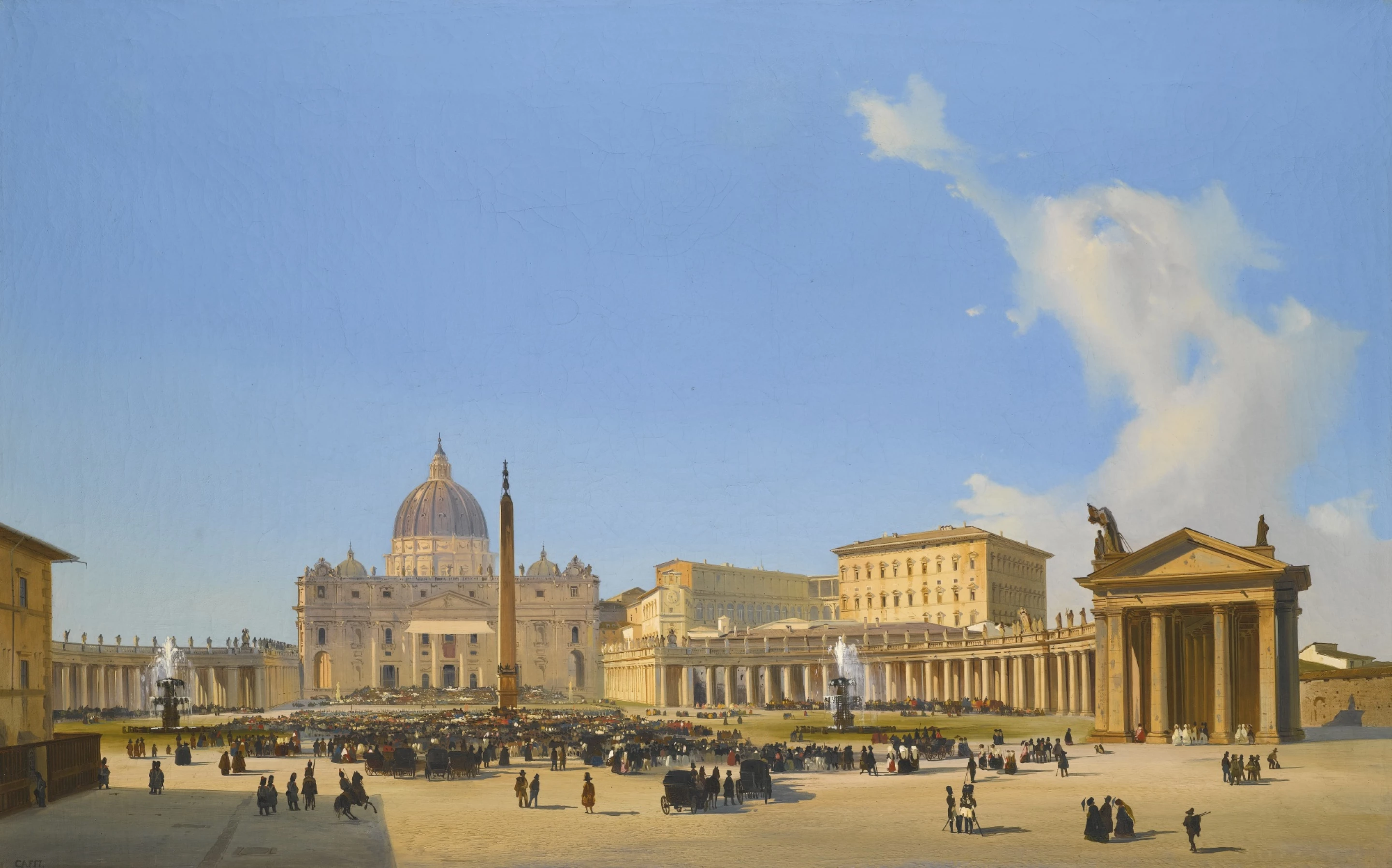
View of Saint Peter's Basilica and Square with crowds awaiting a papal audience

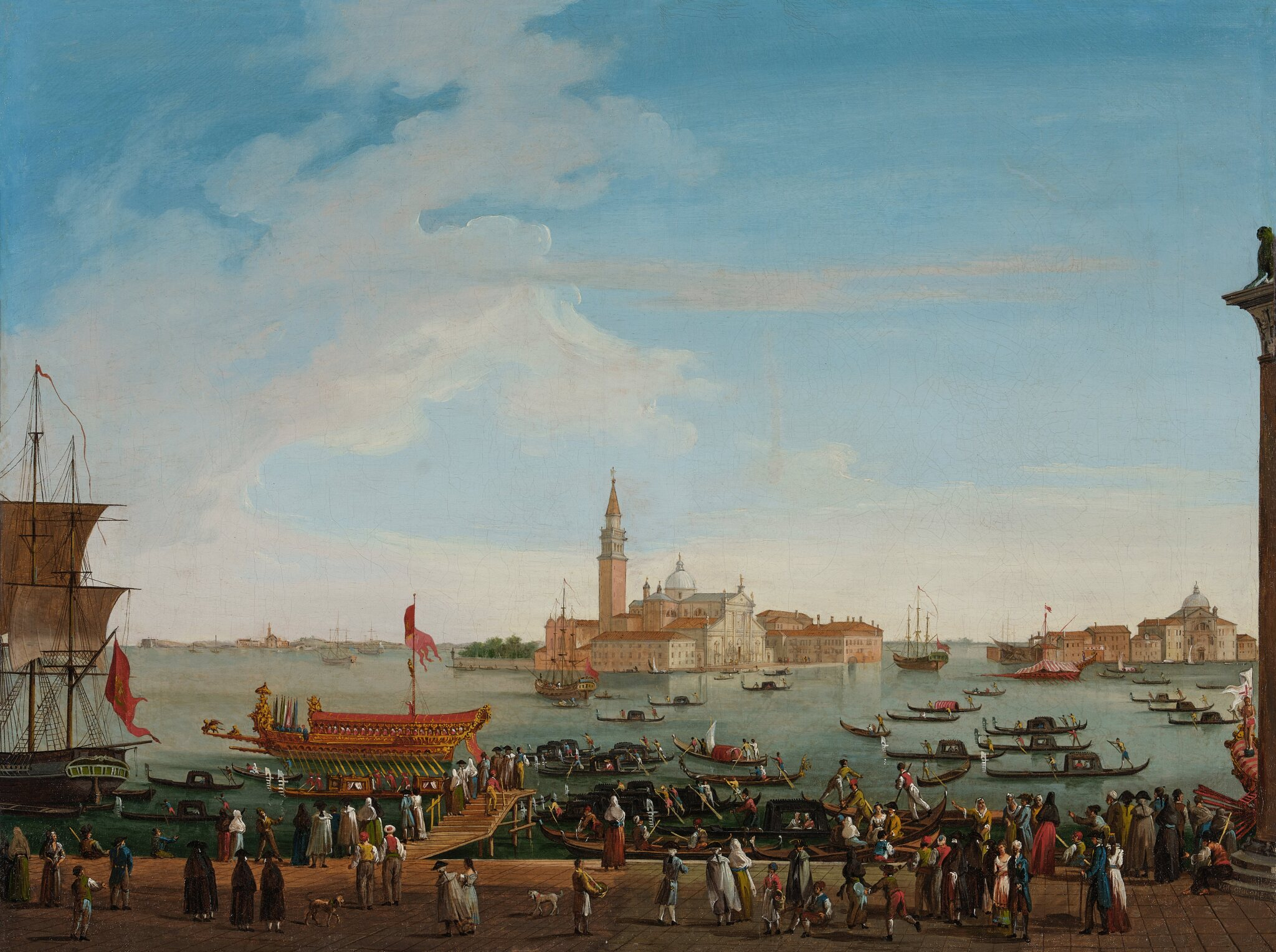
View of the Bacino of San Marco with San Giorgio Maggiore in the Distance

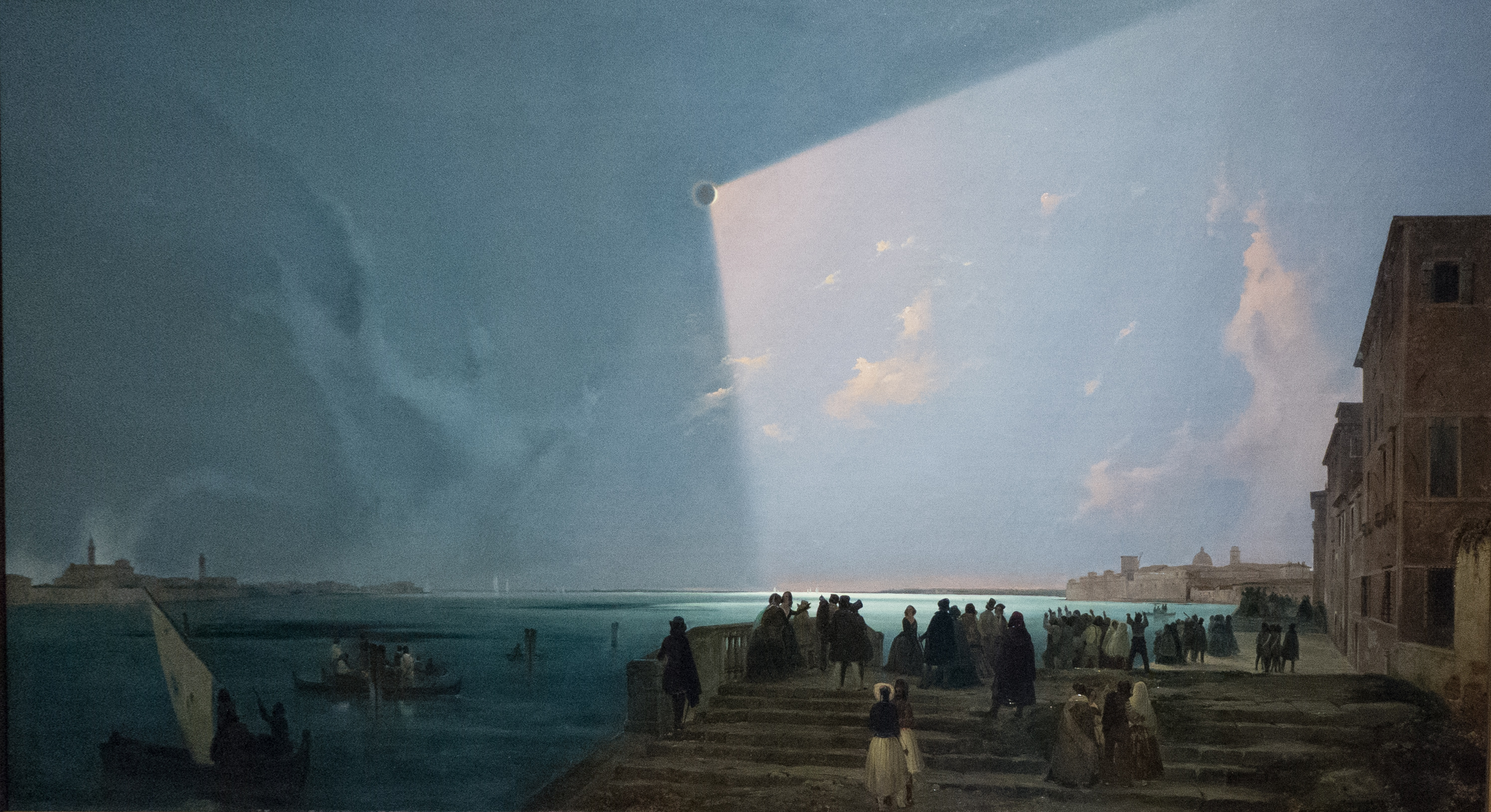
Sun Eclipse at the Fondamente Nove in 1842

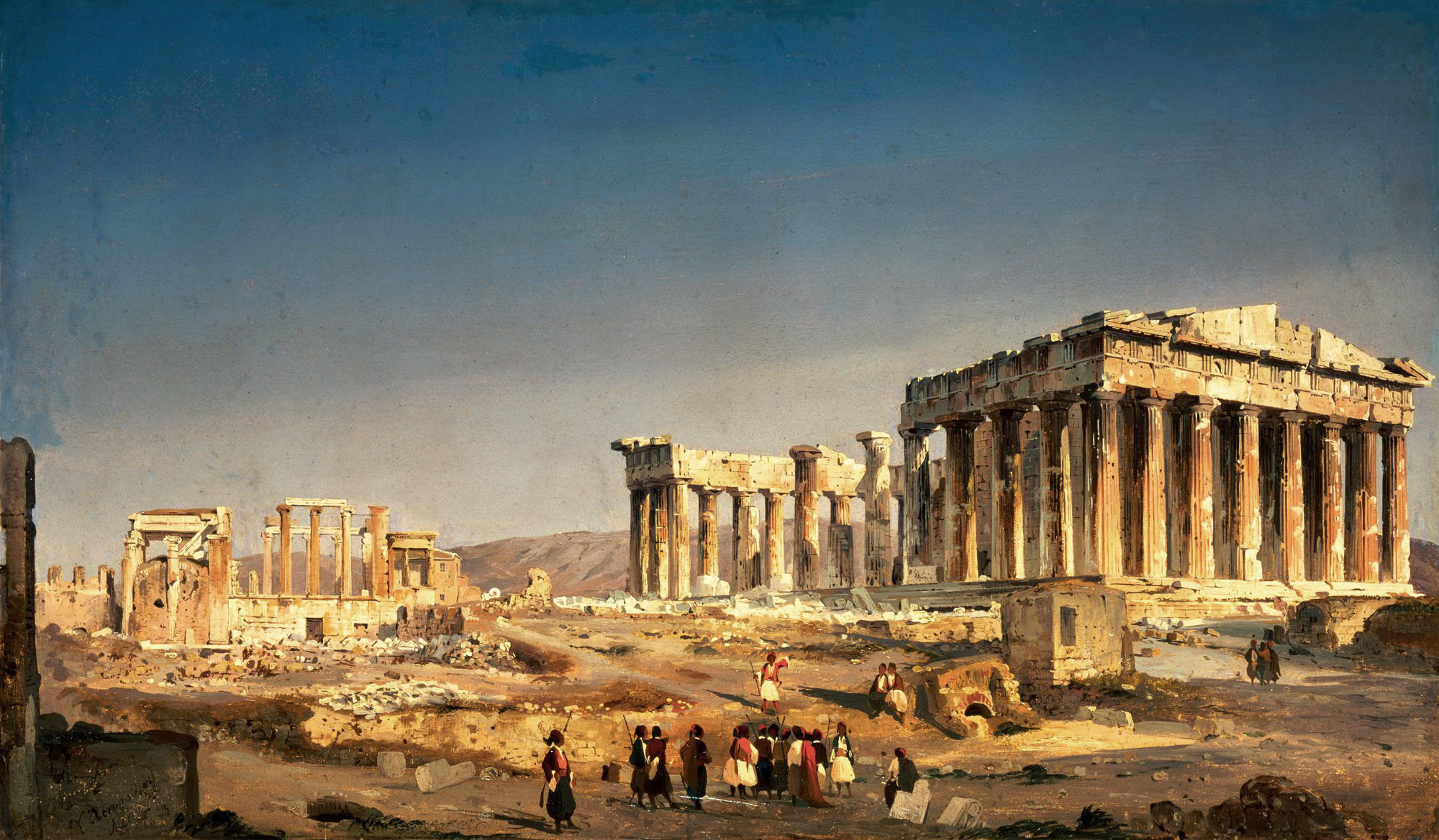
The Partenon

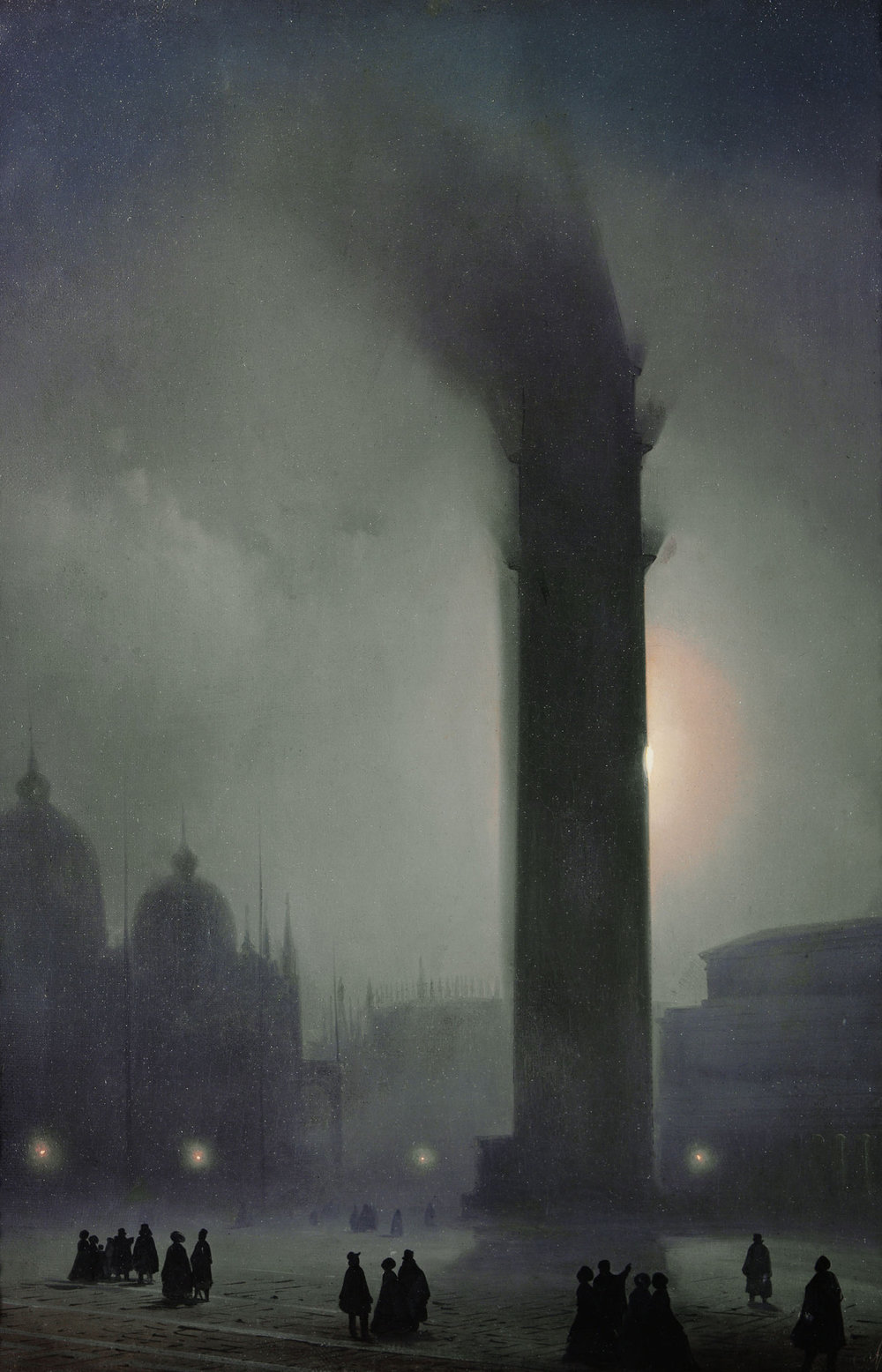
Nocturne with fog in Piazza San Marco

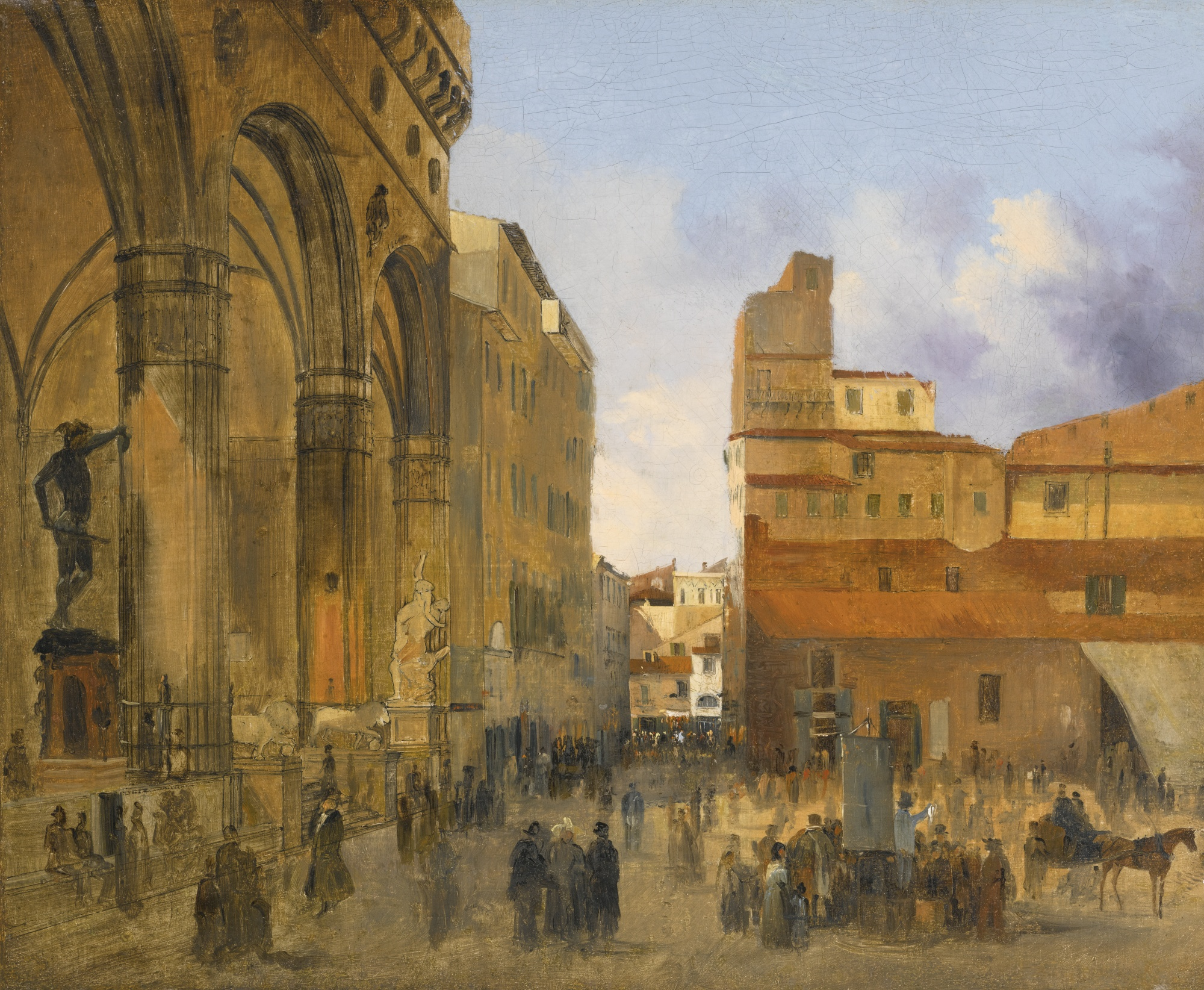
View of the Piazza della Signoria

== Bibliography ==
- Bryan, Michael (1886). Robert Edmund Graves (ed.). Dictionary of Painters and Engravers, Biographical and Critical. Vol. I: A-K. London: George Bell and Sons. p. 208.
- Pittaluga, Mary (1973). "CAFFI, Ippolito". Dizionario Biografico degli Italiani (in Italian). Vol. 16: Caccianiga–Caluso. Rome: Istituto dell'Enciclopedia Italiana. ISBN 978-88-12-00032-6.
