= Fausto Antonioli =

Italian painter

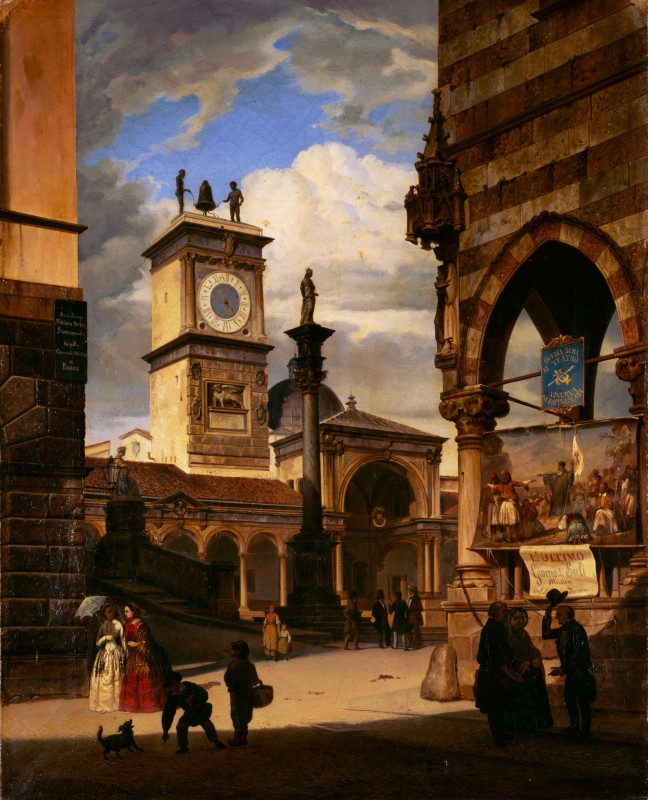
Veduta della piazza Contarena di Udine, 1856 (Art collections of Fondazione Cariplo)

Fausto Antonioli (1814 – 1882) was an Italian painter. He was born in Bergamo and died in Udine.

== Biography ==
Originally from Bergamo, he was a pupil of Giuseppe Diotti at the Accademia Carrara in the fourth decade of the 18th century and subsequently completed his training at the Academy of Fine Arts in Venice, under the Neoclassical painter Odorico Politi and the set designer Francesco Bagnara. From his debut in 1839, he distinguished himself as a portraitist and painter of landscapes, which he showed at the 1844 Exposition of Fine Arts at the Carrara Academy in Bergamo. His presence is also documented in Florence and Rome, where he executed perspective views of the principal monuments in the cities, enlivened by scenes of everyday life. Around 1850, he settled in Udine, where he held a teaching post in the local arts and crafts school.

His painting, which was in line with the canons of the academic tradition, soon gained favour with the Friuli aristocracy, who commissioned views of the city, as well as numerous portraits and still lifes with flowers. His prolific output continued into the 1870s, and his mature work was characterised by a more intense realism in the portraits that were not devoid of photographic effects. The use of photographs as a source of inspiration was a practice the artist was familiar with, thanks to his close friendship with Count Augusto Gabriele Agricola, one of the first to experiment with photography in Friuli.
