= Girolamo Michelangelo Grigoletti =

Italian painter (1801–1870)

Girolamo Michelangelo Grigoletti (29 August 1801 – 11 February 1870) was an Italian painter, active in a Neoclassical style. He was also a professor at the Accademia di Belle Arti di Venezia.

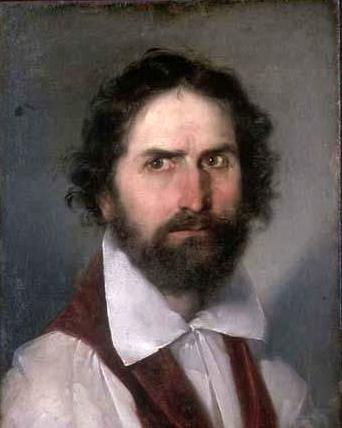
Self-portrait of Grigoletti

== Biography ==
Grigoletti was born at Rorai Grande, now part of Pordenone into a large, peasant family. His paternal uncle, Don Antonio Grigoletti, together with the parish priest of Rorai Grande, arranged for him to enroll in the Accademia di Belle Arti of Venice, where he was a colleague of Lodovico Lipparino. He entered the Academy in 1820, where he studied under Teodoro Matteini. In 1824, he expressed his gratitude to Pordenone for exempting him from military service by presenting the city with a copy from Bonifazio Veronese. In 1835, he made a study trip to Rome.

He obtained a teaching post at the Academy in 1830, was "adjunct" to Lipparino in 1839, and a full professor in 1849. Among his pupils were Giacomo Favretto, Cesare Dell'Acqua, Antonio Dugoni, Frederick Zandomeneghi, Tranquillo Cremona, Eugenio Prati, Gian Battista Carrer, and Eugenio Scomparini.

Among his masterworks are Lucia at the feet of the Unnamed (from an episode in Manzoni's novel I promessi sposi), Erminia seeing Tancredi fall bleeding from his saddle, Venetian doge Francesco Foscari bids farewell to his son Jacopo, the Education of the Virgin in the Sant'Antonio Taumaturgo, Trieste and the Assumption of the Virgin for the Basilica of Esztergom in Hungary.

A school in Pordenone is titled "Liceo Scientifico Statale Michelangelo Grigoletti". He died in Venice, aged 68.

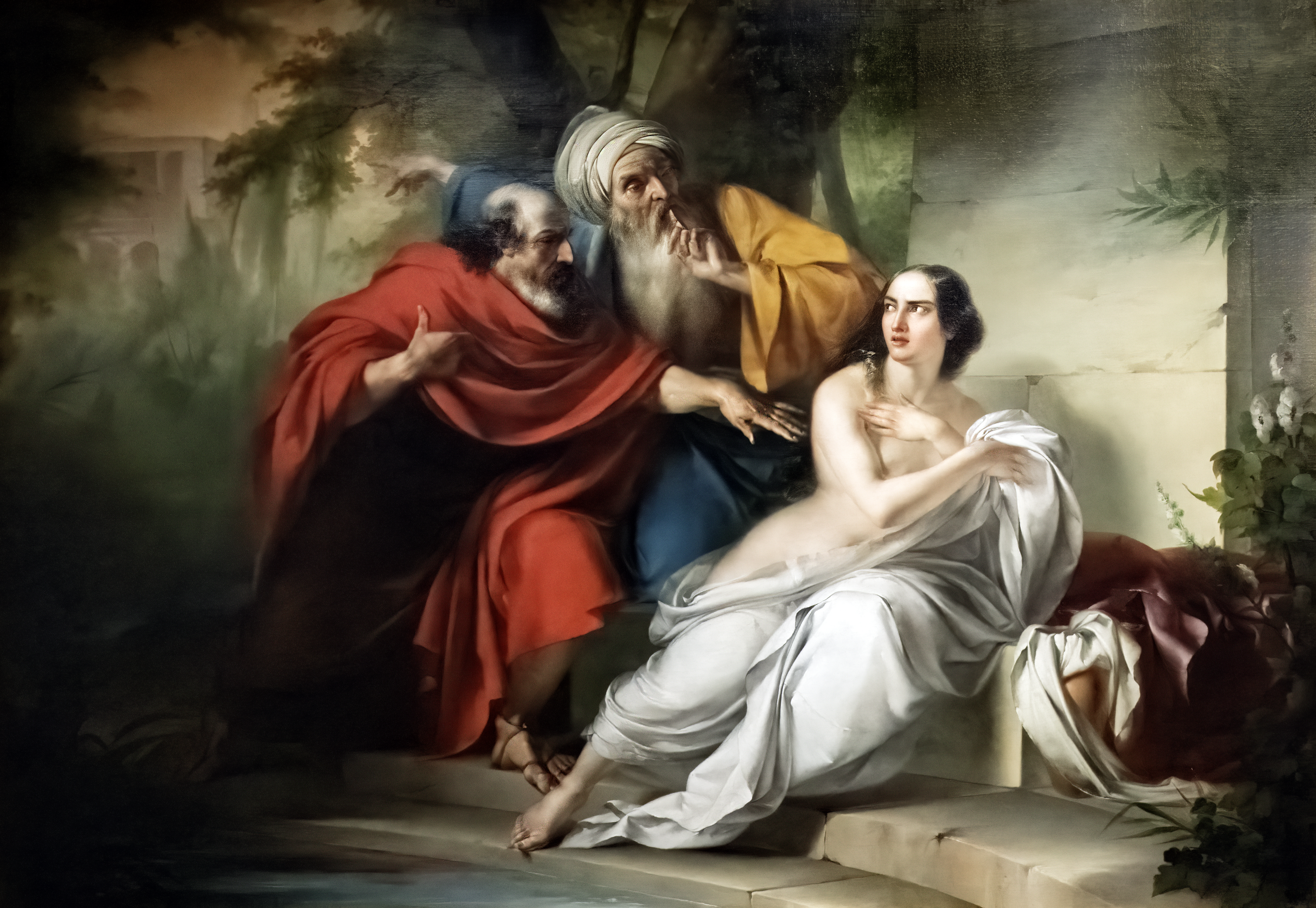
Susanna and the Elders, Ca. 1841, Treviso Museo Luigi Bailo
