= Antonio Dugoni =

Italian painter (1827–1874)

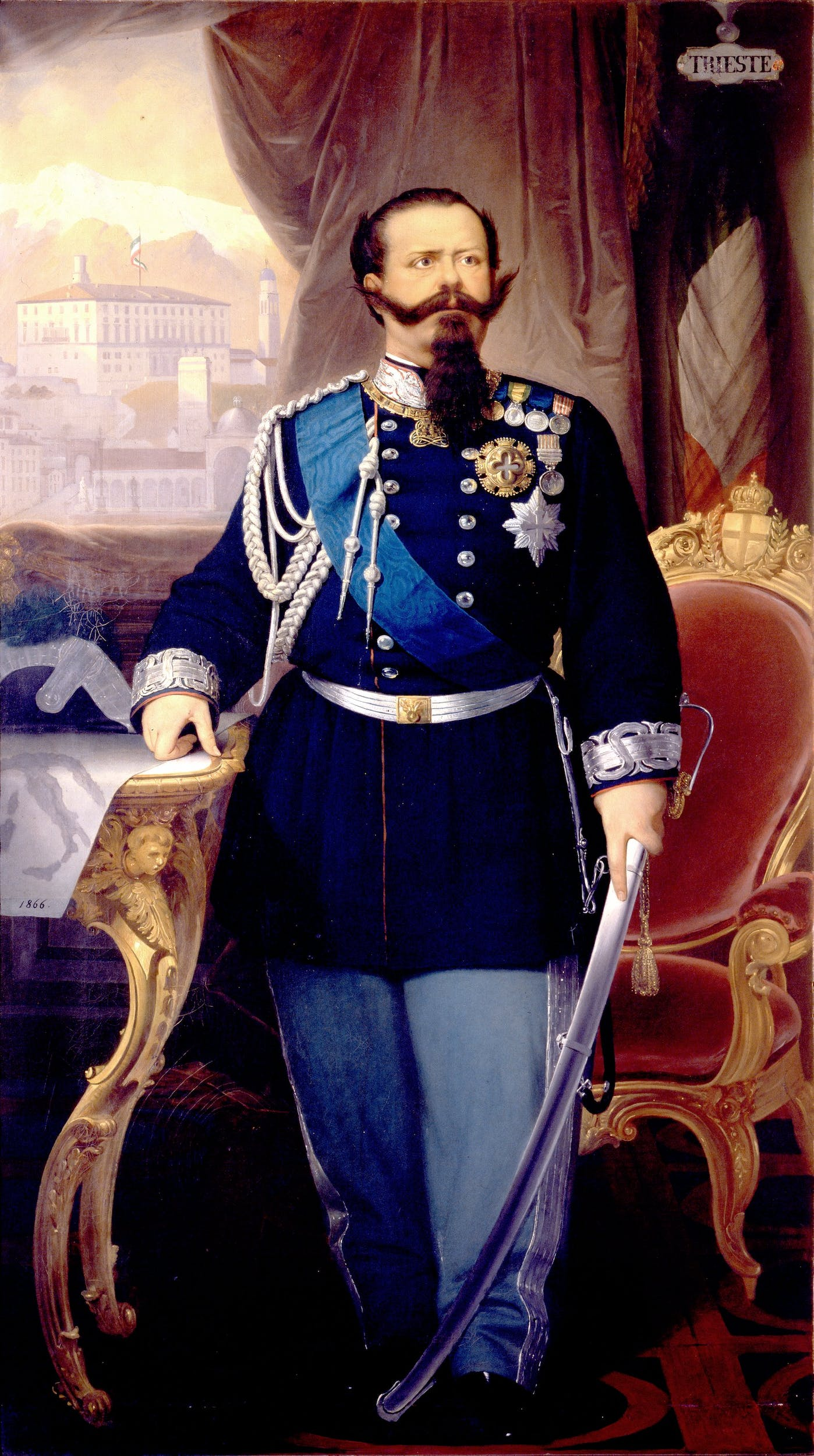
Portrait of King Victor Emanuel, Galleria d'Arte Moderna, Palazzo Pitti, Florence

Antonio Dugoni (1 June 1827 –9 June 1874) was an Italian painter.

== Life and career ==
Antonio Dugoni was born in Cividale del Friuli into a poor family. He began to study painting in 1841 in Udine and then continued his studies at the Accdademia di Belle Arti in Venice with Ludovico Lipparini, Michelangelo Grigoletti and Odorico Politi. In 1845 he won a first prize for artistic invention which earned him an annual subsidy from the city of Cividale. After he completed his studies, he specialized as a painter of historical works, altarpieces and portraits.

Suffering from alcoholism and mental illness, Dugoni died at 47 years of age at the Hospice of St. Mary in Cividale. Many of his works were stored in the city and were destroyed during World War I.

== Works ==
Selected works include:

- David (1847), International Gallery of Modern Art, Ca' Pesaro, Venice
- Our Lady of Sorrows (1848), St. Peter's
- Portrait of King Vittorio Emanuele II (1866), Modern Art Gallery, Pitti Palace, Florence
