= Odorico Politi =

Italian painter (1785–1846)

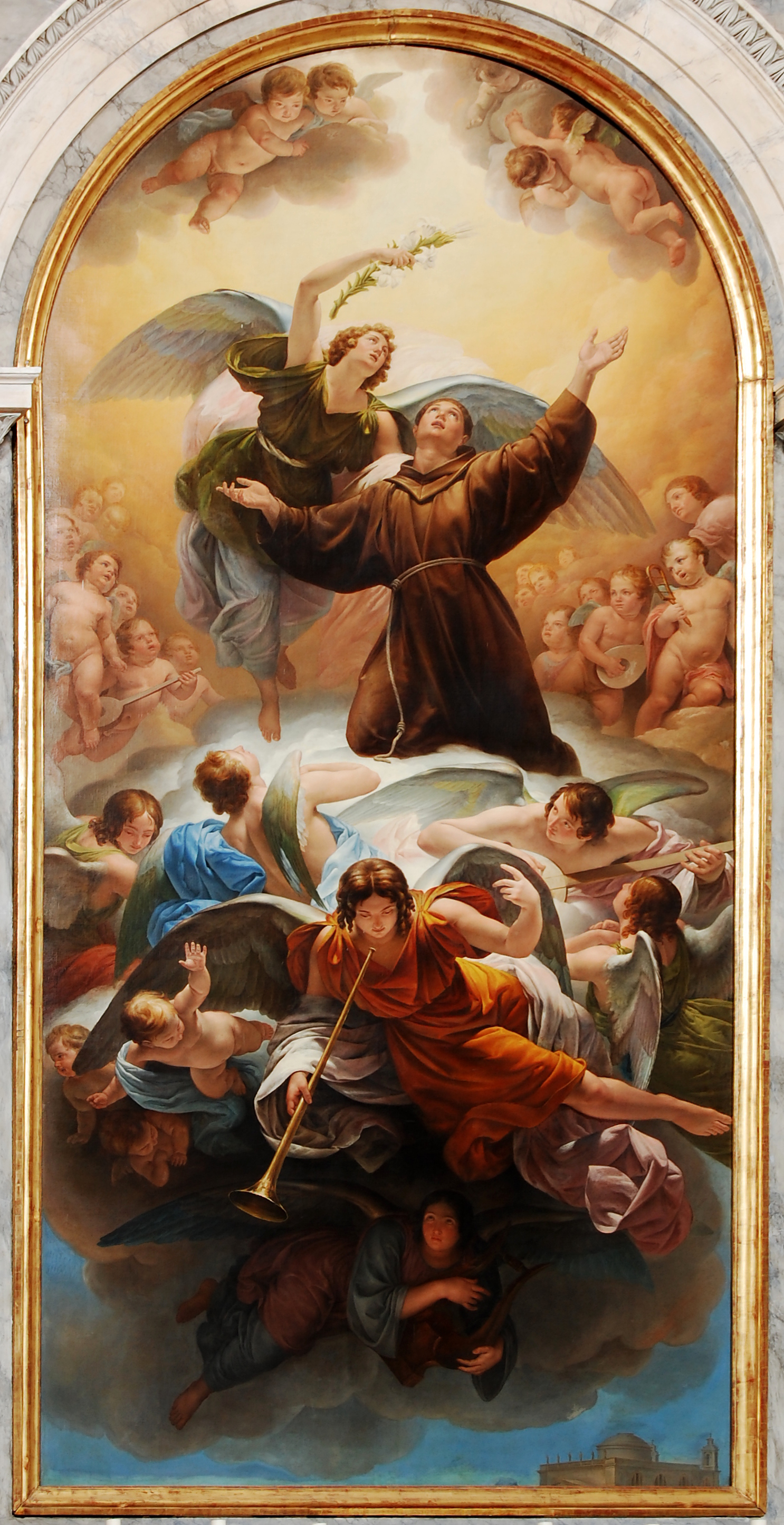
Sant'Antonio in Gloria fresco at Sant'Antonio Taumaturgo in Trieste

Odorico Politi (27 January 1785, Udine – 18 October 1846, Venice) was an Italian painter.

== Life and career ==
Odorico Politi was born in Udine, and studied in Venice at the Accademia di Belle Arti with Teodoro Matteini. In 1812 he returned to Udine and began a career as a painter of neoclassical frescoes, specializing in historical and mythological subjects. Some of these frescoes can now be seen at the Palazzo Antonini and at Napoleon's Royal Palace in Venice. In 1831 he received an appointment as professor at the Accademia of Venice, where he had studied. Notable students include Pompeo Marino Molmenti, Antonio Dugoni, Fausto Antonioli and Cesare Dell'Acqua.

== Works ==
Politi's frescoes with religious subjects are found in the churches of Attimis, Clauzetto, Felettano, Pavia di Udine, Tarcento, Trieste, Udine, Venice and Vito d'Asio. Selected works include:

- Portrait of Canova - 1810 - Civic Museums of Udine
- Portrait of Count GB Bartolini - 1823
- The model of the painter - 1838
- Santa Filomena, Rome rescued by angels - 1838 - Cathedral of Rovigo
- Portrait of Abbot Angelo Dalmistro - 1839
- Self Portrait - 1840 - Civic Museums of Udine
