= Giardini Papadopoli =

Terraced garden in Venice, Italy

Coordinates: 45°26′18.64″N 12°19′14.44″E

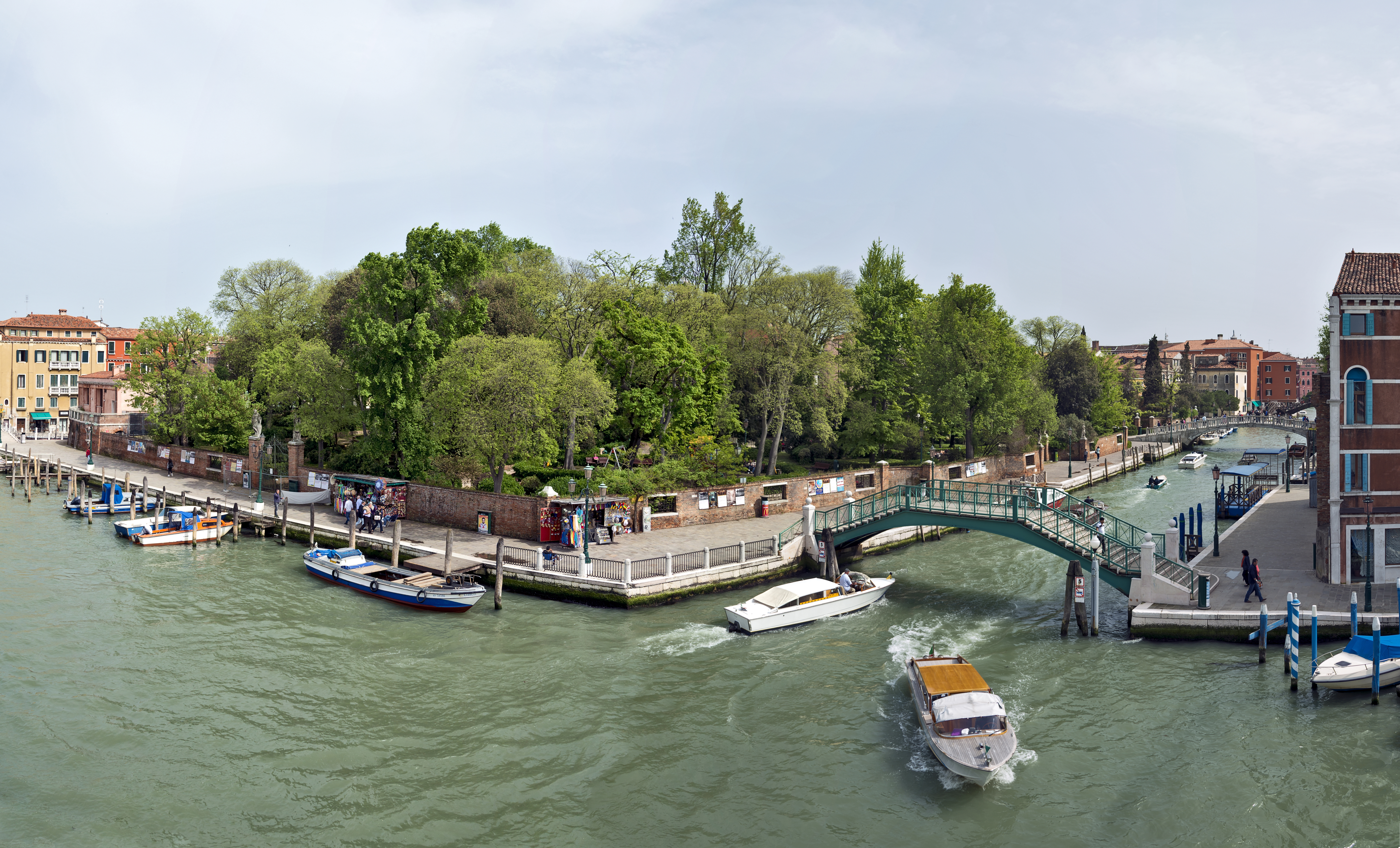
- Interactive map of Giardini Papadopoli
- Type: Botanical gardens; Children's playground
- Location: Venice, Italy
- Area: 8,800 square metres (2.2 acres)
- Created: 1834
- Designer: Francesco Bagnara

Giardino Papadopoli is a terraced garden filled with shade trees in the Venetian sestiere of Santa Croce, between the Venezia Santa Lucia train station and Piazzale Roma.

== History ==
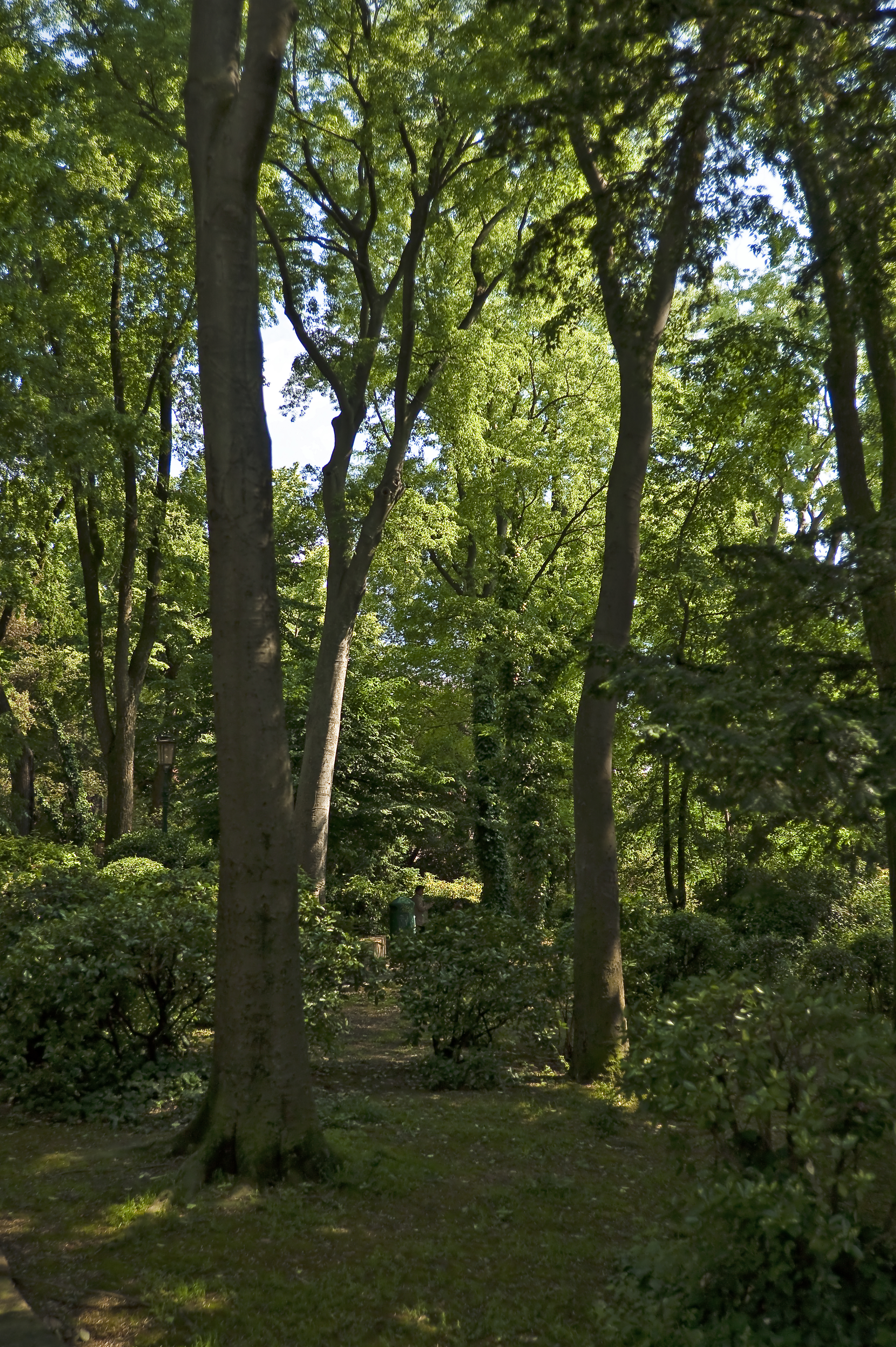
Giardini Papadopoli (arbres)

The gardens occupy the lands of the demolished monastery of Santa Croce. Inhabited by a community of Poor Clare nuns, it was closed in 1810 during the Napoleonic suppressions and reduced to civilian use. The complex was demolished a few years later along with other buildings to make way for the park.

The first park was laid out in 1834 by Francesco Bagnara for Teresa Mosconi, wife of Count Spiridione Papadopoli, who had become owner of the land. They owned the Palazzo Foresti Papadopoli. A follower of Giannantonio Selva and Giuseppe Jappelli, Bagnara created an English-style park to the north, toward the Grand Canal, in line with the romantic tendencies of the period, characterized by sinuous avenues and small hills. The remaining part, however, was more regular with geometrically shaped flowerbeds.

In 1863, Niccolò and Angelo Papadopoli commissioned Marco Quignon to expand and modify the gardens. There was also an aviary with silver parrots and pheasants and a circular terrace overlooking the Grand Canal.

Damaged by World War I bombing, around 1920 the garden was opened to the public. A third of its area was destroyed in 1933 when the Rio Novo canal was constructed. The western part was largely flattened and separated from the rest by the excavation of the Rio Novo, necessary for the disposal of traffic from the new terminal. On the same occasion a large hotel complex was erected on the south side.

== Description ==
The park currently occupies an enclosed area of 7,500 m² in an insula bounded on the north by the Grand Canal, on the east by the Rio dei Tolentini, on the south by the Rio del Magazen, and on the west by the Rio Novo.

It is dimly lit both because of the fairly dense tree cover and the presence of evergreen species such as holm oaks, cypresses and cedars. Other species present are hackberry, sofore, linden, yew, maple and oak. The undergrowth consists of specimens of laurel, evonymus, aucuba, viburnum and patches of Ruscus hypoglossum.

The southern part of the park is overlooked by the winter garden of the Papadopoli Hotel, built in 1970 to a design by Pietro Porcinai.

Beyond the Rio Novo, adjacent to Piazzale Roma, two small, unfenced patches of the original gardens still survive, measuring 655 and 710 m² respectively. The first is basically reduced to a flowerbed over which a few cypresses stand; the other is more interesting for the presence of a small fountain set among "fake" rocks and is what remains, perhaps, of a nymphaeum or cliff.
