= Giovanni Andrea Darif =

Italian painter

Giovanni Andrea Darif (1801–1870) was an Italian painter, mainly of religious subjects and portraits in a Neoclassical style. He was active in Udine, Milan and the Comasco.

== Biography ==
He was born in either Venice, or to a librarian in Udine. He trained at the Accademia di Belle Arti di Venezia under Teodoro Matteini. He followed an archaic style strongly recalling Renaissance, mostly Neo-Raffaelesque arrangements, as well as topics. He died in Milan.
