= Cesare Dell'Acqua =

Italian painter (1821–1905)

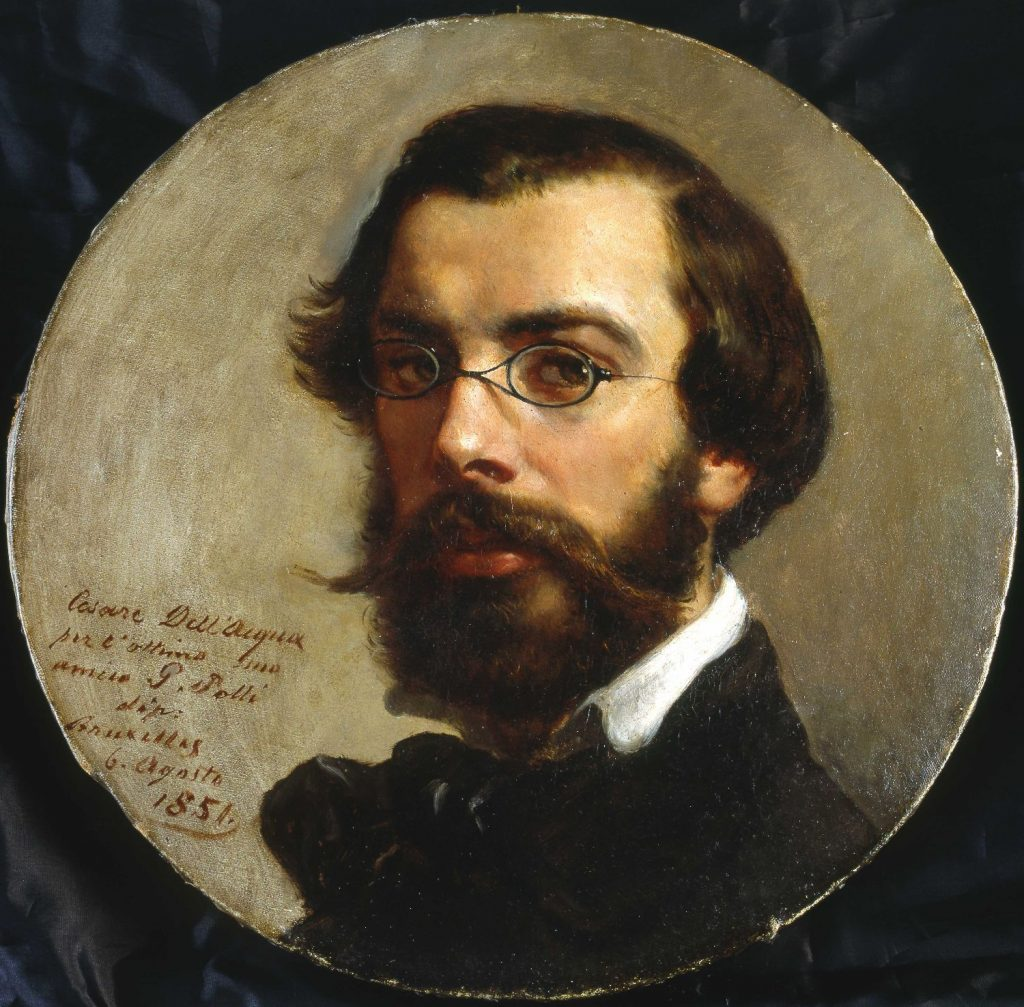
- Cesare Dell'Acqua, Self-portrait, 1851
- Born: Cesare Felice Giorgio Dell'Acqua; 22 July 1821; Pirano d'Istria near Trieste
- Died: 16 February 1905 (aged 83); Ixelles, Belgium
- Education: Venice Academy of Fine Arts
- Known for: Historical painting, genre scenes
- Style: Academic art, Orientalist themes
- Spouse: Carolina van der Elst
- Patrons: Baron Ludovico Luigi Reszan

Cesare Dell'Acqua (22 July 1821 – 16 February 1905) was an Italian painter known for historical works.

== Life and career ==
Cesare Felice Giorgio Dell'Acqua was born in Piran (or Pirano d'Istria), near Trieste, the son of Andrea and Caterina Lengo. He first studied in Koper, but by 1833 he had relocated to Trieste. From 1842 until 1847 he attended the Venice Academy of Fine Arts where he studied with Ludovico Lipparini, Odorico Politi and Michelangelo Grigoletti. One of his early historical paintings, The Meeting of Cimabue and the Young Giotto (1847), was acquired by the Archduke Johann of Austria. After this, he began to receive commissions from noble families, including that of Prince von Lichtenstein.

Following his studies, he travelled through Europe with his patron, Baron Ludovico Luigi Reszan, visiting Vienna, Munich and Paris. In 1855 he married Carolina van der Elst and the couple had two daughters: Eva and Alina. His daughter Eva Dell'Acqua went on to become a noted singer and composer.

In around 1848, he moved to Brussels where his brother Eugenio lived and where he continued his studies with Louis Gallait, who became a major influence on his work. He began to specialize in works representing historical events. Between 1852 and 1877 he completed a number of commissioned works in Trieste that established his reputation as a painter. In Brussels, he exhibited with strong responses and received commissions from prominent families in Brussels, such as Errera, van Wambecke and van der Elst. He also painted two works for the Greek Orthodox Church of Trieste; The Sermon of John in the Desert which was so highly acclaimed that he was awarded town citizenship in 1851.

In 1873 Dell'Acqua participated at the Universal Exhibition in Vienna and also exhibited in London the following year. This resulted in international commissions for his work. At the end of his career, he settled in Brussels, where he completed numerous paintings for use as book illustrations. In addition to historical themes, Dell' Acqua also painted many female subjects dressed in traditional Greek and oriental costume.

Dell'Acqua died in Ixelles on 16 February 1905.

== Work ==
His paintings are included in a number of public collections, including the Museums of Brussels, Antwerp, Trieste and Bruges. While he is primarily noted for his historical works, he also painted Orientalist subjects.

Select list of paintings

- The Meeting of Cimabue and the Young Giotto, 1847
- Jesus Calling the Small Children to Him, c. 1851
- The Sermon of John in the Desert, 1851
- Greek Mother, 1860
- Arrival of Empress Elisabeth in Miramare, 1865
- Ferdinand Maximilian of Austria is appointed Emperor of Mexico, 1867

Gallery

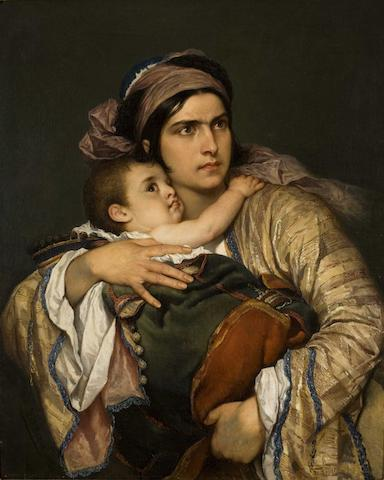
Greek Mother, 1860

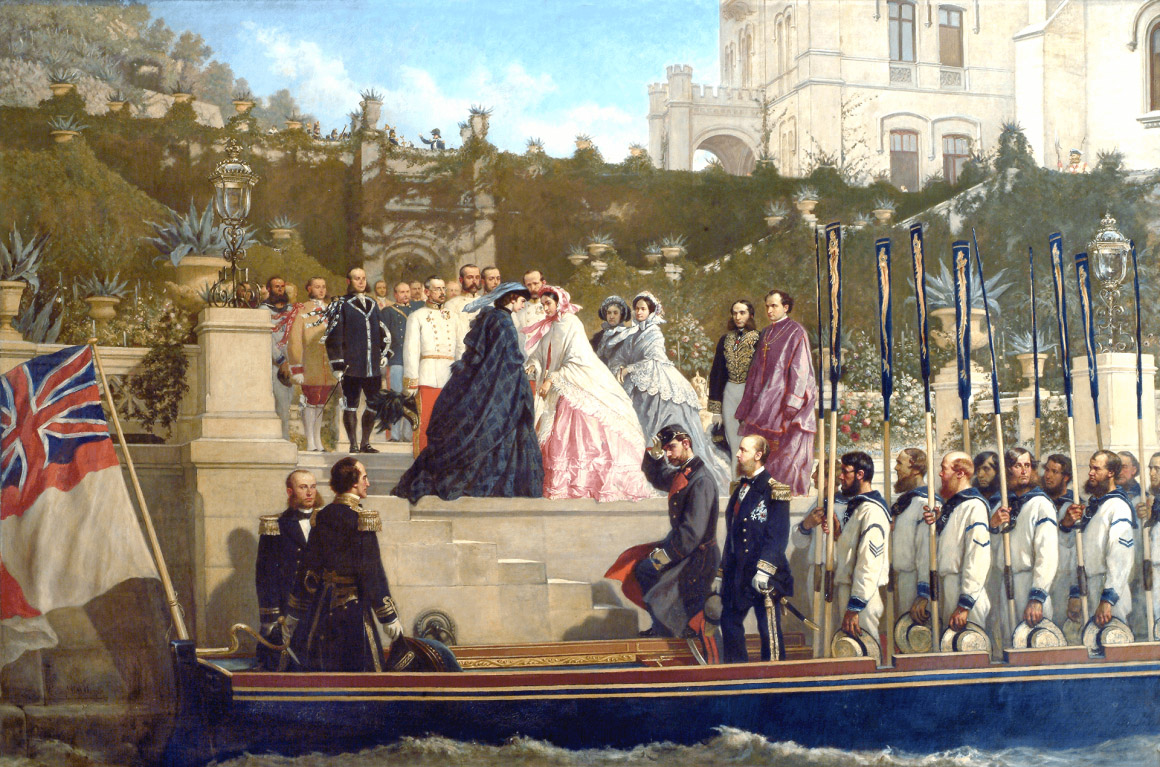
Empress Elisabeth and Franz Joseph I arrive at Miramare to meet Ferdinand Maximilian and his wife Charlotte, 1865

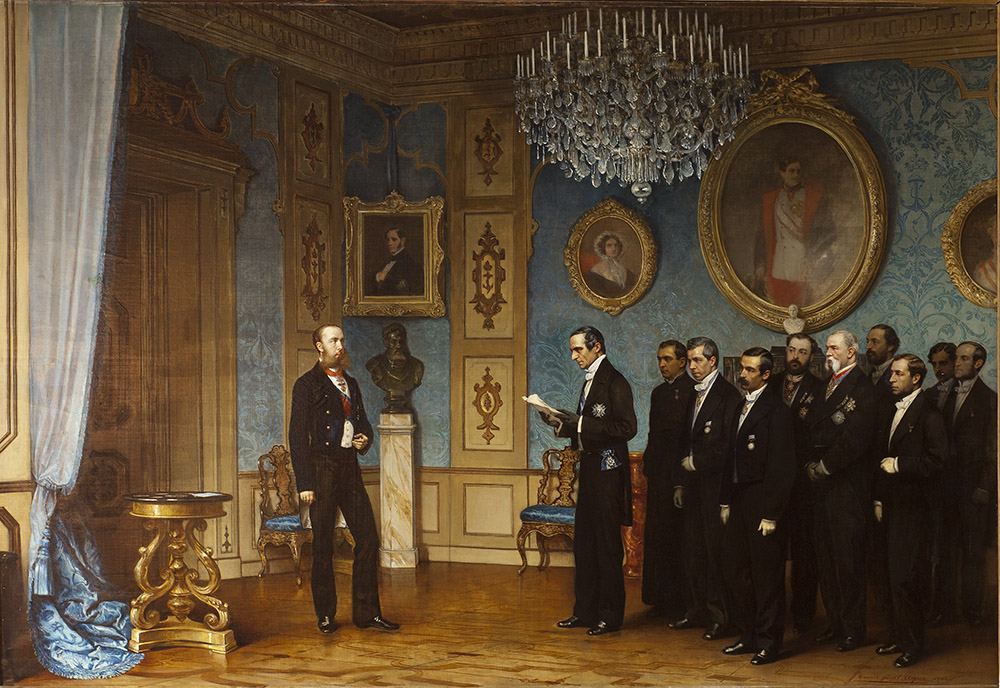
Ferdinand Maximilian of Austria is appointed Emperor of Mexico, 1867

== See also ==
- List of Orientalist artists
- Orientalism
