= Ludovico Lipparini =

Italian painter (1800–1856)

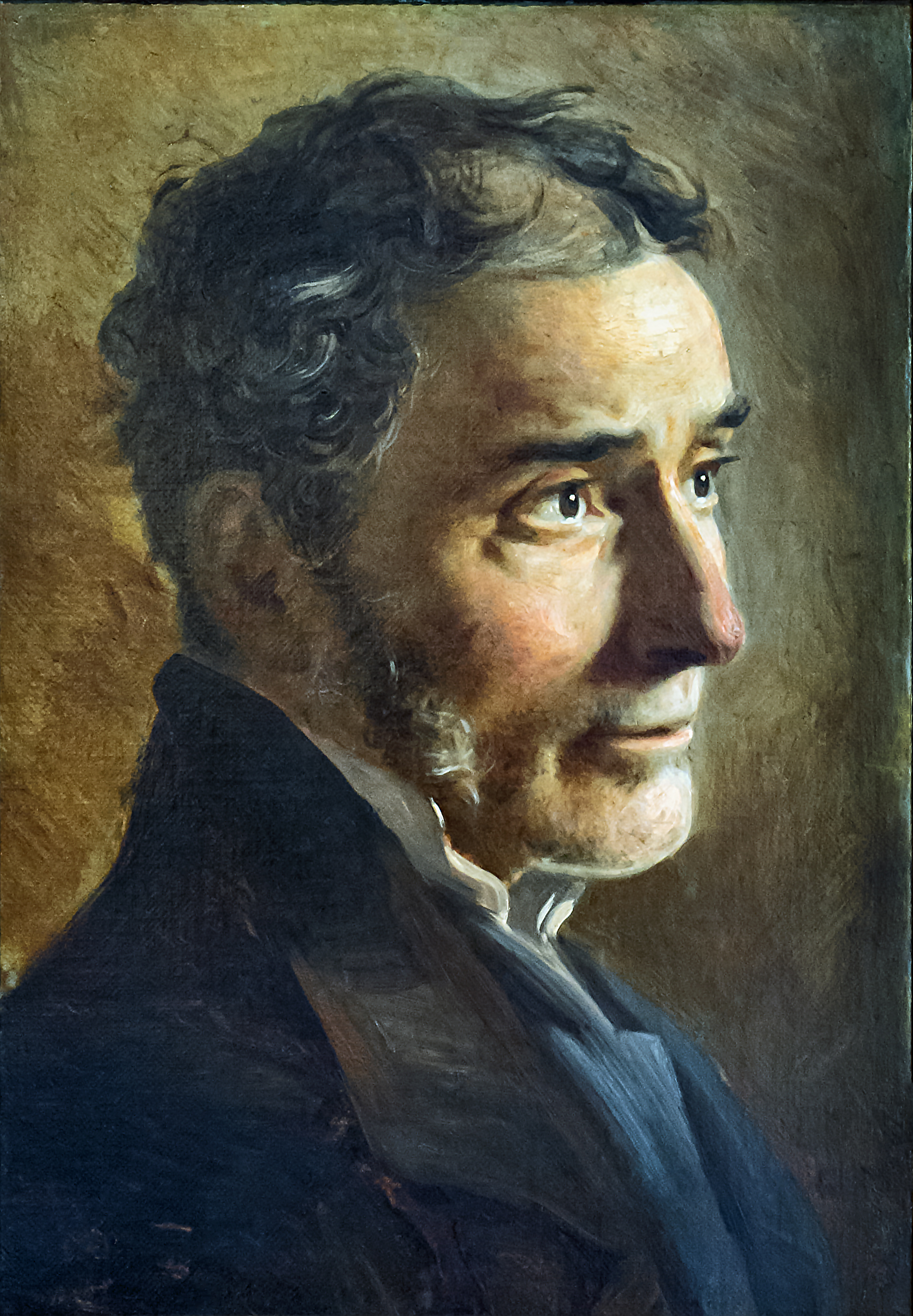
Portrait of Ludovico Lipparini by Tranquillo Cremona

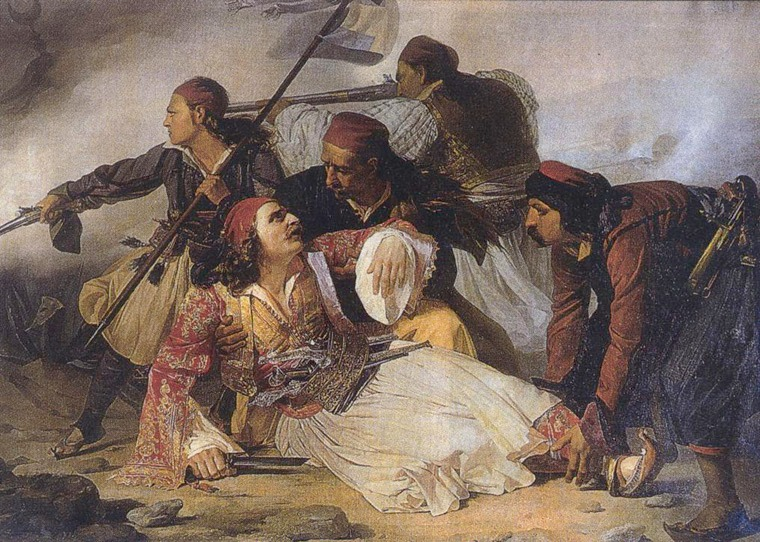
Death of Markos Botsaris

Lodovico Lipparini (February 17, 1800 – March 19, 1856) was an Italian romantic painter.

== Biography ==
He was born at Bologna, and was instructed in that city, where he brought himself into notice at the age of fifteen. In 1820 he was in Rome and Naples, and during 1822 and 1825, in Venice, where he became professor at the Accademia di Belle Arti in 1838, and Professor of Painting in 1848. He died in Venice.

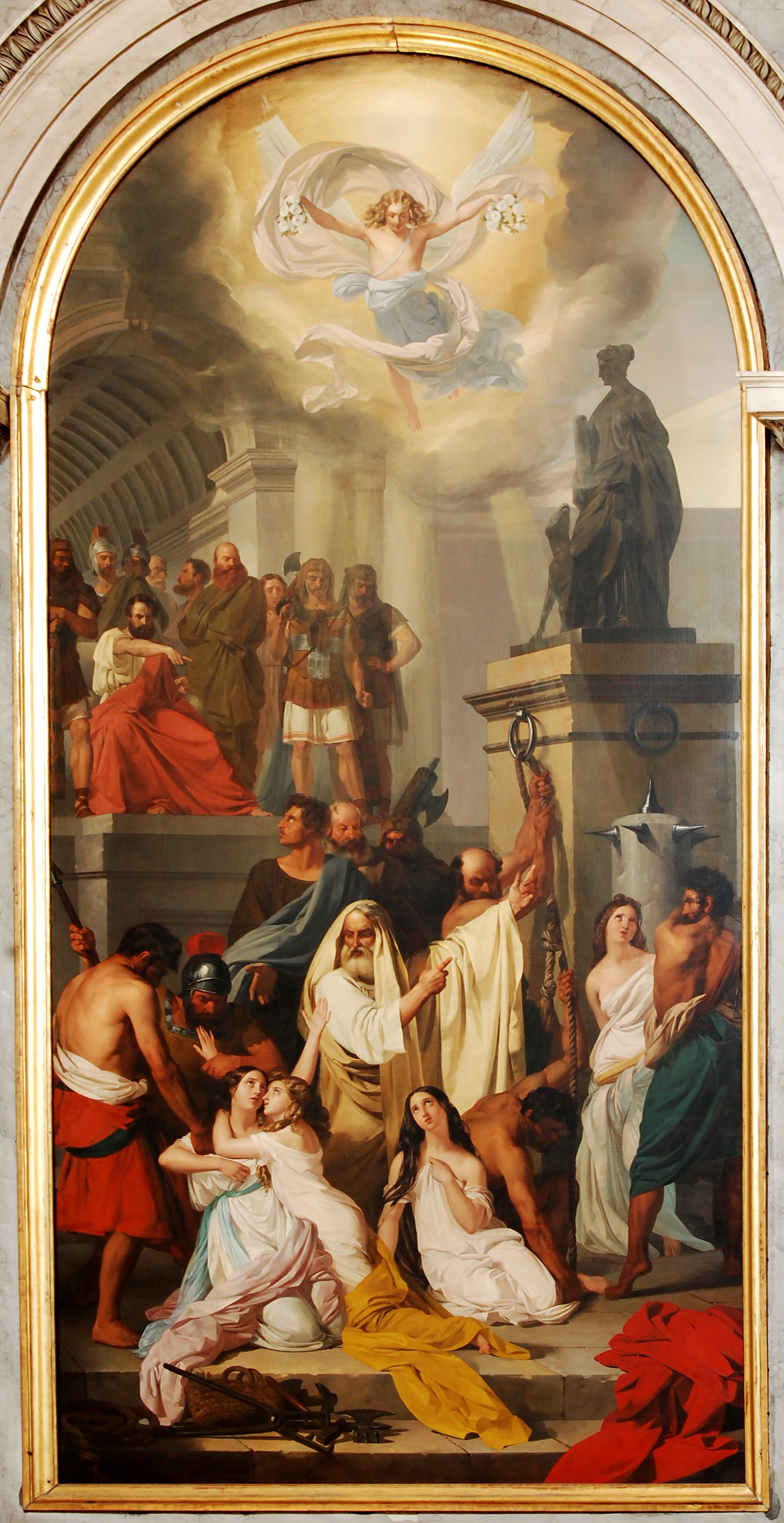
Martyrdom of Aquileans

He was facile both in history and portrait paintings. Among his first works was a Marius besieged by the Cimbri. In 1822, he painted the Oath of the Horatii. In 1835, he painted the doomed Doge Marino Faliero. In 1836, Cain, Madonna Lia, and Torquato Tasso a Sant'Anna. In 1840 he painted The Martyrdom of the Saints of Aquileia (Sant'Antonio Taumaturgo, Trieste) and in 1841, the Death of Marco Botzaris.

He was prolific as a portrait painter; among his subjects were Prince Bacciocchi and his wife Elisa; Professor Giuseppe Barbieri, Count Kraglianovich, Professor Antonio Basoli (Bologna, 1823); Cavaliere Leopoldo Cicognara (1825); Conte Rizzo of Venice; Cesare Rouel; Gioacchino Rossini; Giovanni Contri and his wife Carlotta Felicorri; the two daughter and son of Felice Levi; Marchese Francesco Sampieri and his wife Donna Anna de Gregori di Squillace; Madama Perina Chatelet in Comastri; Signor Giovanni Pirotti and his wife Ginevra Bartolucci; Caterina Magri from Felicori; and Signore Augusto Pevet.

Among his pupils were Antonio Dugoni, Pompeo Marino Molmenti, Cesare Dell'Acqua, Antonio Rotta, and Antonio Zona. His wife, Anna Matteini (died 1878 in Venice), daughter of the painter Teodoro Matteini, was apt in painting landscapes including: Attendolo Sforza with Landscape (1822) and Hercules rescues Lica from the Sea (1826).
