= Teodoro Matteini =

Italian painter (1753–1831)

Teodoro Matteini (Pistoia, 1753 - Venice, 1831) was an Italian painter, mainly of historical and religious subjects in a Neoclassical style.

== Biography ==
His father, Ippolito Matteini, born 1720, was a decorative painter and was the teacher of the design in the public schools of Pistoia. He was Tedoro's first influence. Under the patronage of, he moved to Rome to work in the studio of Domenico Corvi, and later worked with Anton Raphael Mengs, until he could establish his own studio. He painted in Rome for San Lorenzo in Lucina.

He was active in Bergamo, Milan, and Venice. In 1802 at Venice, he was elected professor of painting at the Academy of Fine Arts, and in 1804, or design and in 1807 became professor in the new academy. Matteini was able to restore to the academy a large collection of stucco and terracotta models collected by the abate Filippo Farsetti.

He is best known for his many pupils, including Giovanni Andrea Darif of Udine, Bartolomeo Ferracina of Bassano, Giovanni Busato of Vicenza, Murari of Florence, Sebastiano Santi of Murano, Francesco Hayez and Cosroe Dusi of Venice, Giovanni De Min of Belluno, Michele Fanolli of Cittadella, Lodovico Lipparini of Bologna, and Girolamo Michelangelo Grigoletti.

Among his masterworks are a painting of Angelica and Medoro, of which Raphael Morghen made a reproductive print.

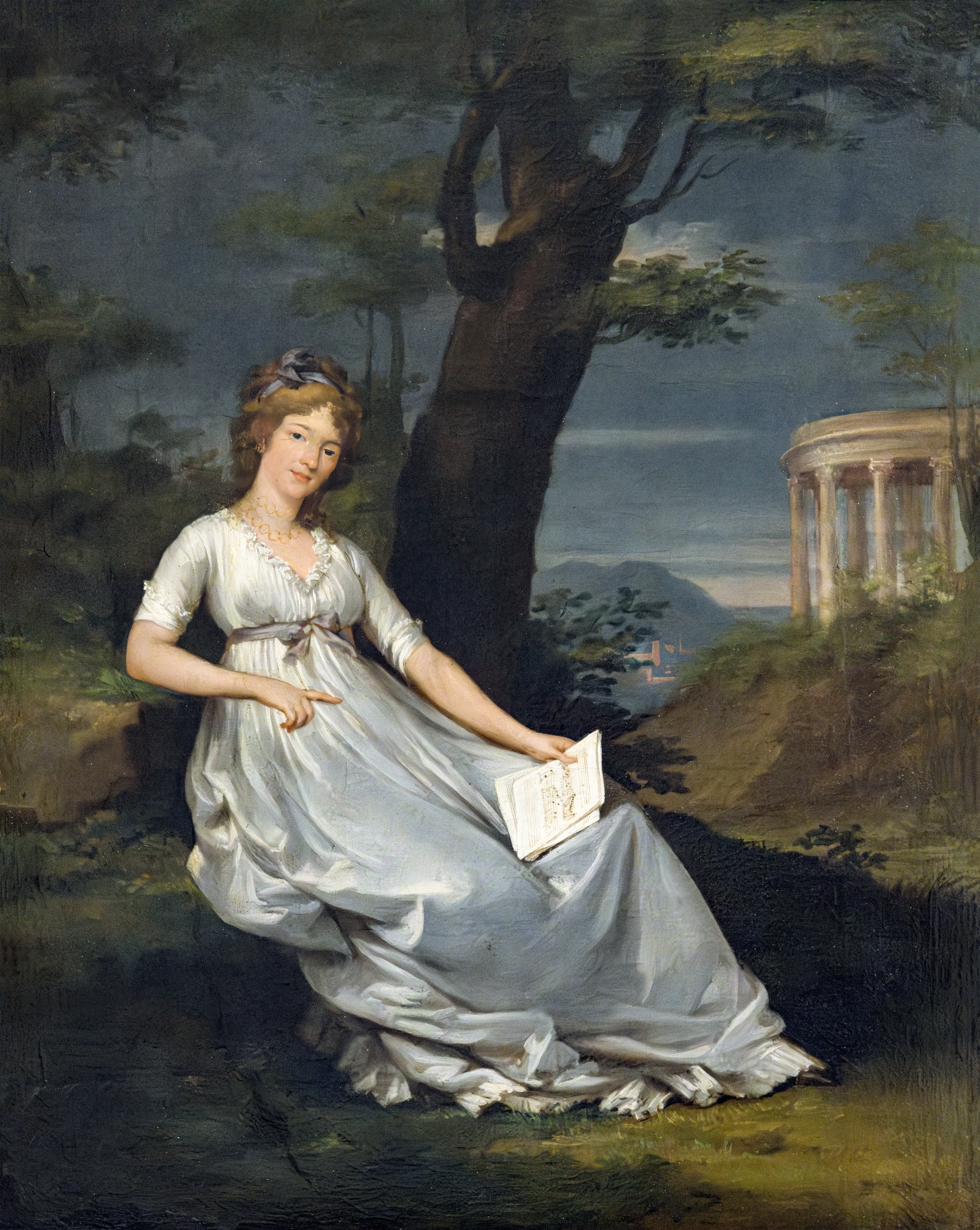
Portrait of a young lady with a sheet of music - Gallerie dell'Accademia

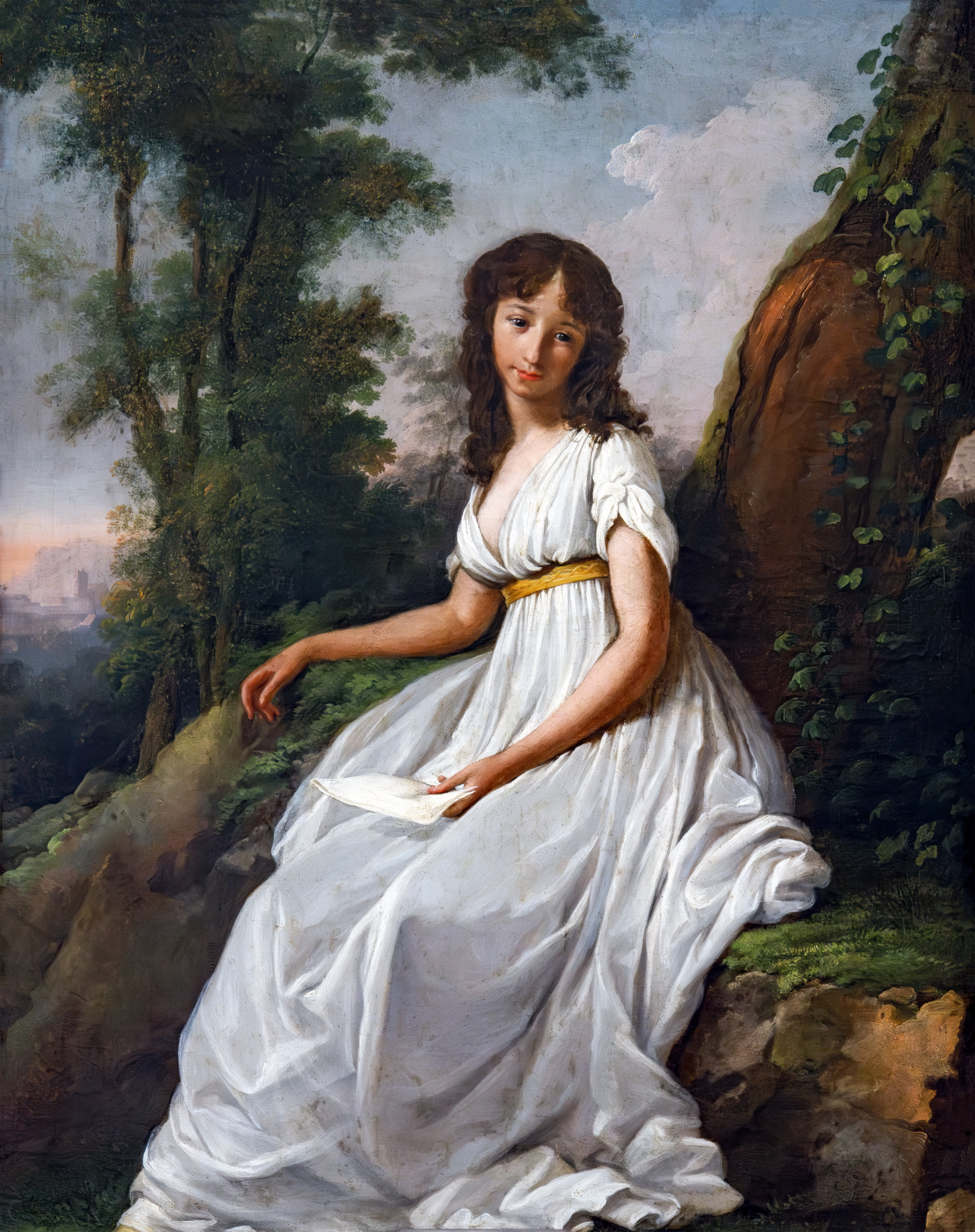
Portrait of a young lady - Gallerie dell'Accademia

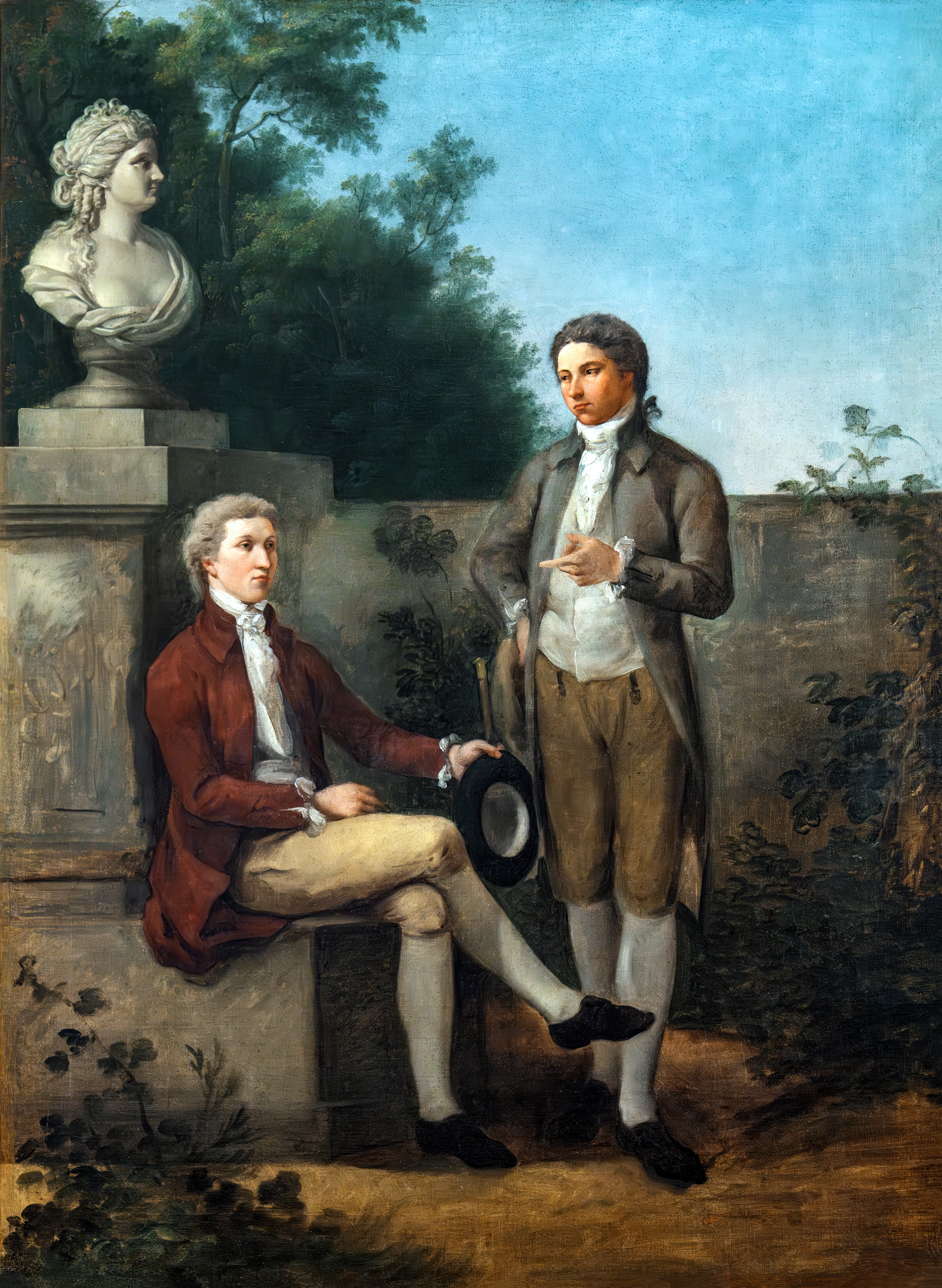
Portrait of two gentlemen in a landscape - Gallerie dell'Accademia
