= Francesco Bagnara =

Italian scenographer and landscape architect

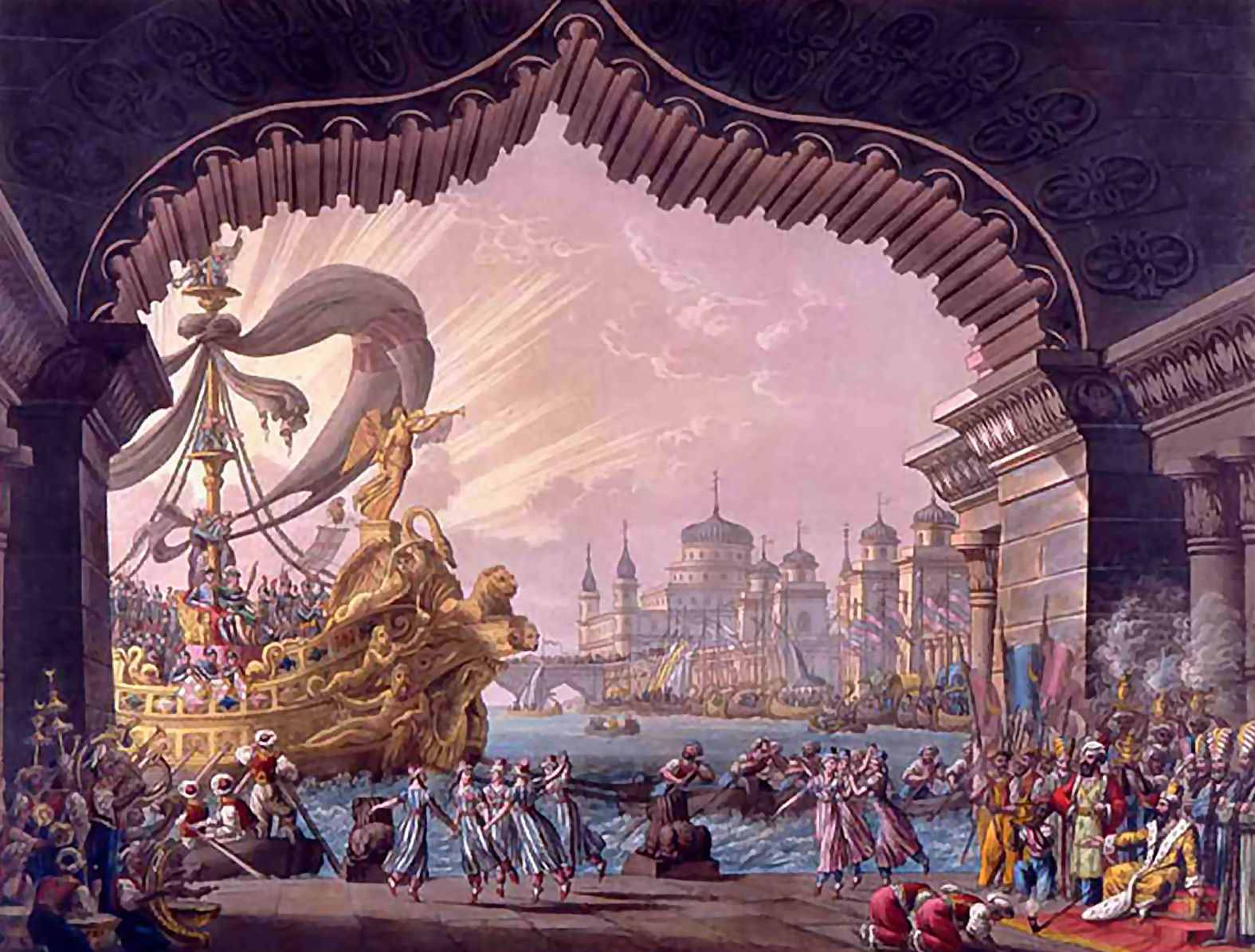
Set for Act I of Il crociato in Egitto by Meyerbeer.

Francesco Bagnara (1784 in Vicenza – 21 October 1866 in Venice) was an Italian scenographer, decorator and landscape architect.

== Biography ==
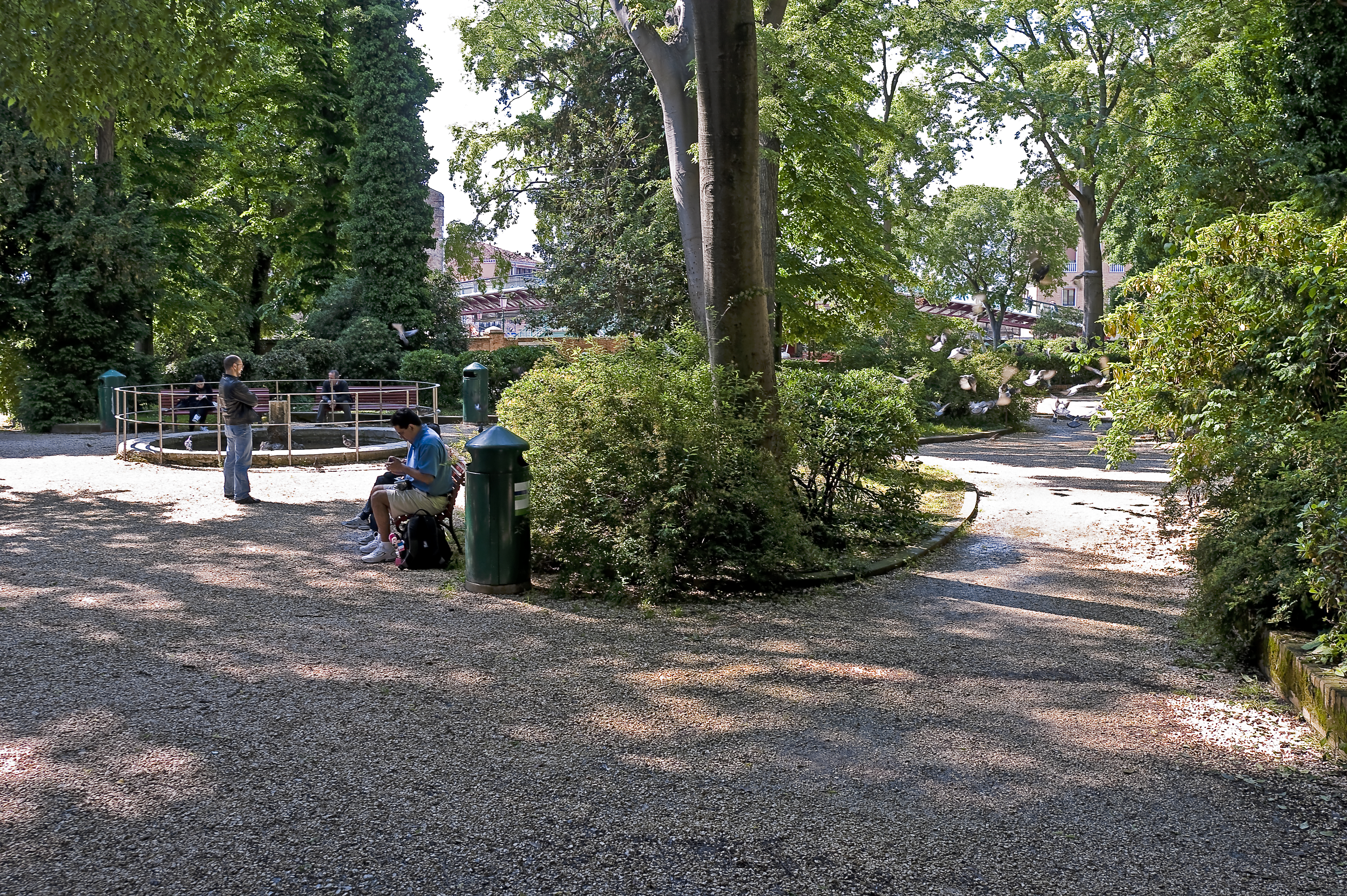
Giardini Papadopoli

Francesco Bagnara came from a poor family and began work as a decorative room painter. Thanks to the interest of a local noble family (the Angarans), he was able to go to Venice, where he studied with Giuseppe Borsato and helped him paint decorations for the Teatro La Fenice. Around 1812, with the financial assistance of the Papadopoli family, he was able to open his own studio. He was later to design the Papadopoli Garden, for Count Spiridione Papadopoli.

His first clients were the Teatro San Moisè and the Teatro San Benedetto, and later became the official designer at La Fenice. During this period, he designed sets for several now-famous operas by Gioachino Rossini.

He also supplied decorations for provincial theaters. Because they generally could not afford full new sets for each production, he created a series of scenarios (about a dozen) that could be easily readapted for the occasion. None of these survive, but albums of watercolor sketches have been preserved at the Museo Correr.

In addition to his theater work, he decorated churches and palaces and designed gardens featuring mounds, lakes, bridges and faux ruins; after the style of Giuseppe Jappelli. His most notable work was at the Giardini Papadopoli, although much of it was later destroyed to create an extension for the bus terminal at the Piazzale Roma. From 1838 to 1854, he was a professor of landscaping at the Accademia di Belle Arti. He contributed to the design of the garden at the Villa Parco Bolasco in Treviso.

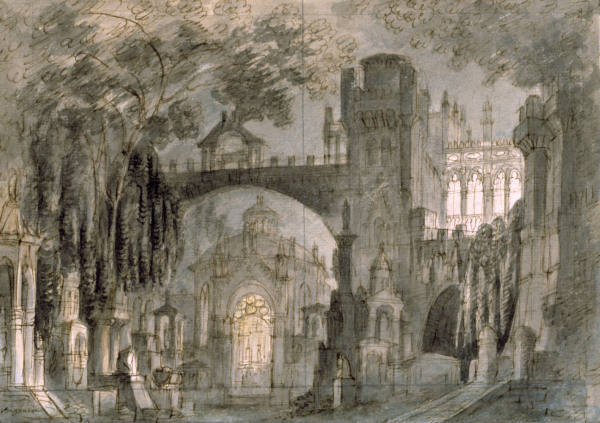
Sketch for Lucia di Lammermoor by Donizetti.

Beginning in a Neo-Classical style, he gradually adopted Romanticism. He was known for his lack of concern for historical veracity, once having set La sonnambula in what looked like a Roman forum (instead of an Italian village), for example. Occasionally, he used machines to create theatrical effects; notably at a festival celebrating the coronation of Ferdinand I of Austria in 1835. According to his official obituary, he created over 1,100 scenarios.
