= Musei Civici di Padova =

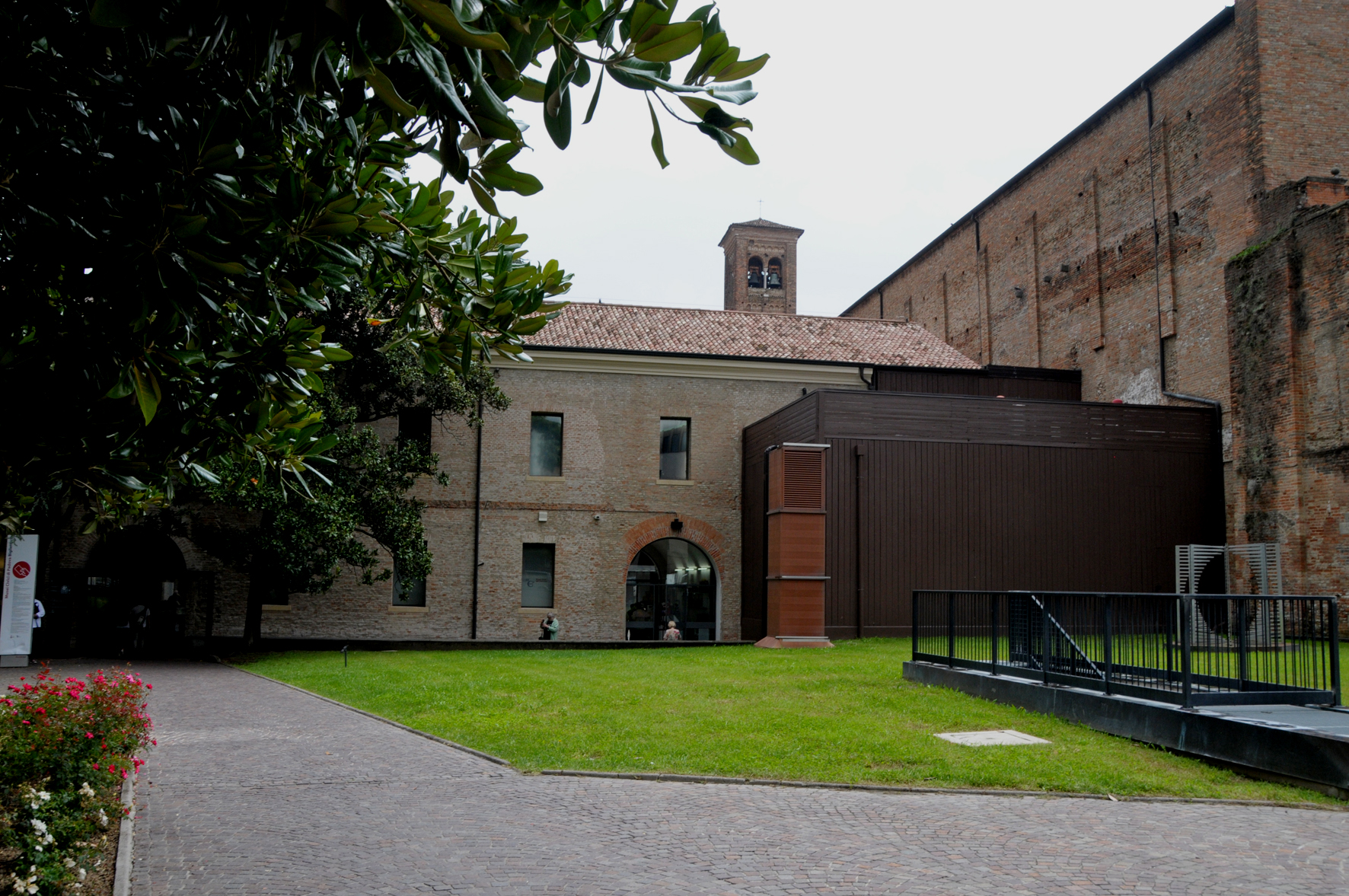
Entrance to Museum

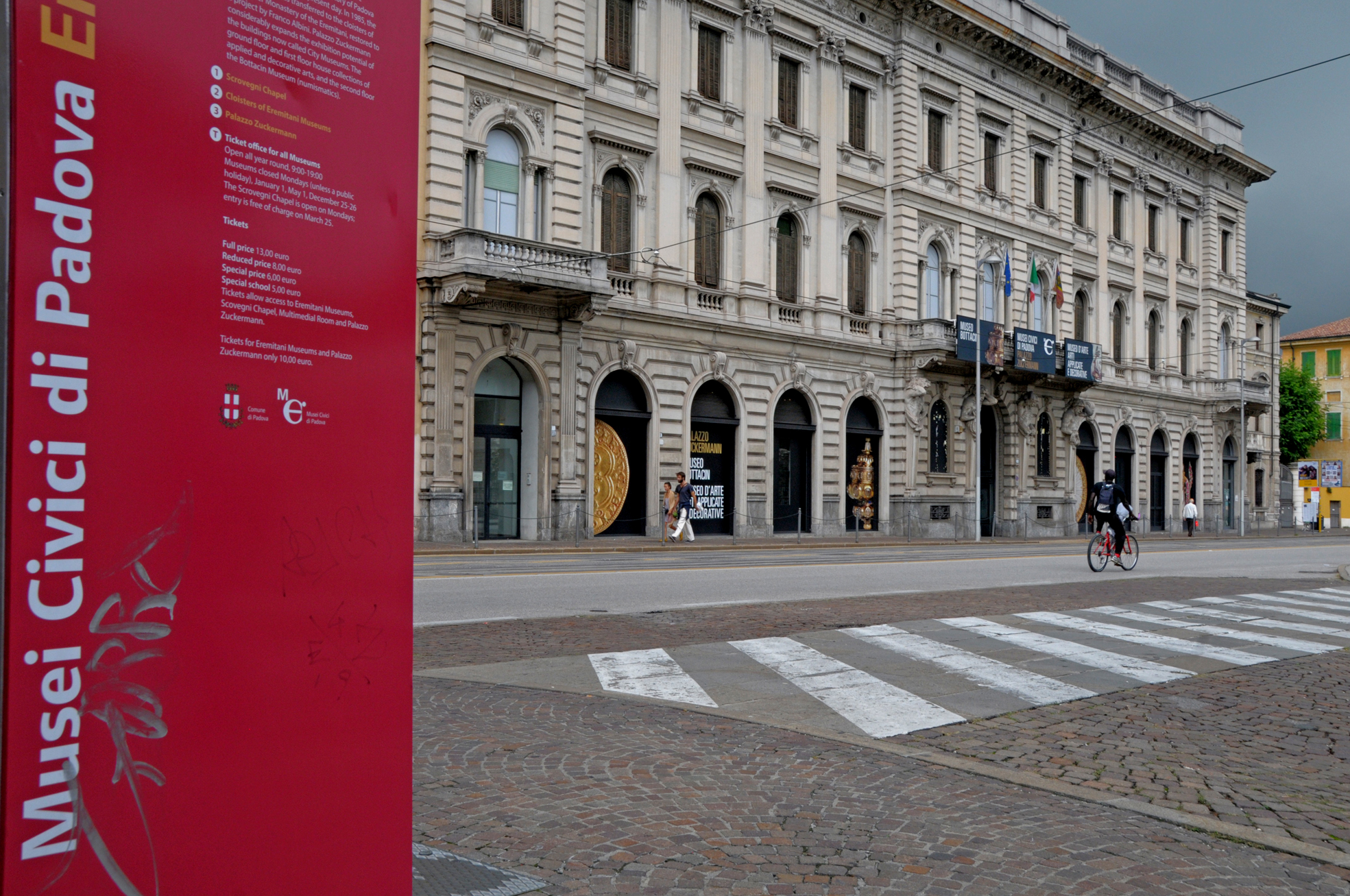
Facade of Palazzo Zuckermann

The Musei Civici di Padova or degli Eremitani is a complex of museums and historic sites, centered on the former convent of the Eremitani (Augustinian order), and its famous Cappella degli Scrovegni with its Giotto fresco masterpieces. The complex is located on Piazza Eremitani, at the edge of the historic center of Padua, region of Veneto, Italy. The complex includes halls of archaeological objects and – in the nearby Palazzo Zuckermann – a museum of modern and medieval applied art.

== History ==
The original collection arose with the acquisition of works from suppressed ecclesiastical institutions, including in 1783 of the convent of San Giovanni da Verdara and in 1810 of many other institutions. In 1825, the abbot Giuseppe Furlanetto displayed his collection of Roman and Greek lapidary inscriptions in the logge del Palazzo della Ragione. The collection was expanded by the donation of 1864 by Leonardo Capodilista. Under the patron Andrea Gloria, this collection and other works came under the ownership of the commune, leading to the formation of the Pinacoteca, as well as civic library and archive.

== Pinacoteca ==
The painting gallery includes works by Lorenzo Veneziano, Giovanni da Bologna, Francesco Squarcione, Jacopo Bellini, Lorenzo Costa, Girolamo Romano, called il Romanino, Paolo Veronese, Antonio Rotta, Giorgione, Palma il Giovane, Quentin Metsys, Antonio Canova, Andrea Briosco, and Tiziano Aspetti.

Among specific works in the collection are:

- Crucifix by Giotto derived from the altar of the Cappella degli Scrovegni
- Angels by Guariento derived from the Cappella della Reggia Carrarese
- Madonna and Child by Boccaccio Boccaccino
- Dinner at House of Simon and a Crucifixion by Jacopo Tintoretto
- St Joseph and Child Jesus, Madonna, Christ in the Garden by Giambattista Tiepolo
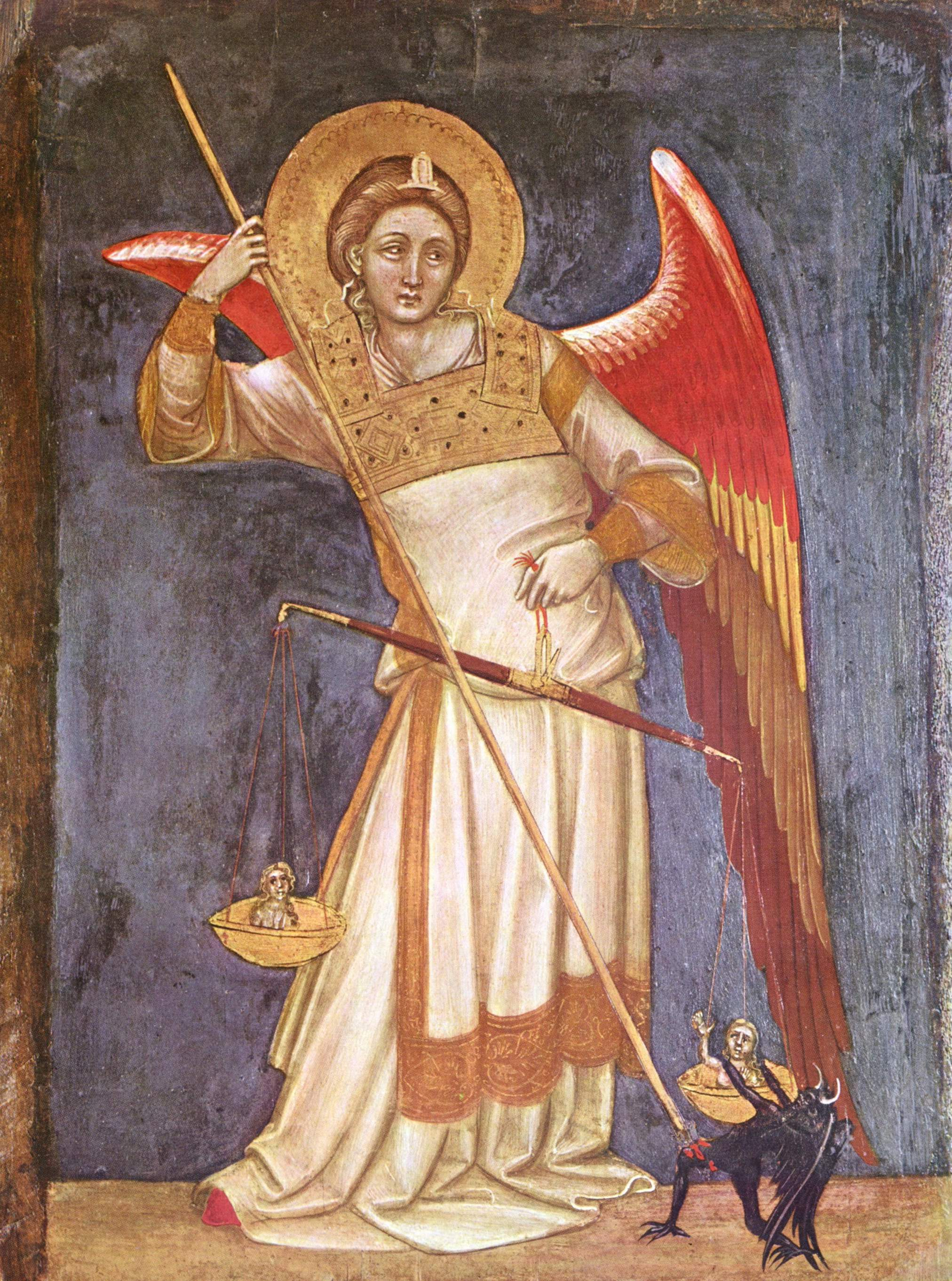
St Michael Spearing Devil while Weighing Souls by Guariento

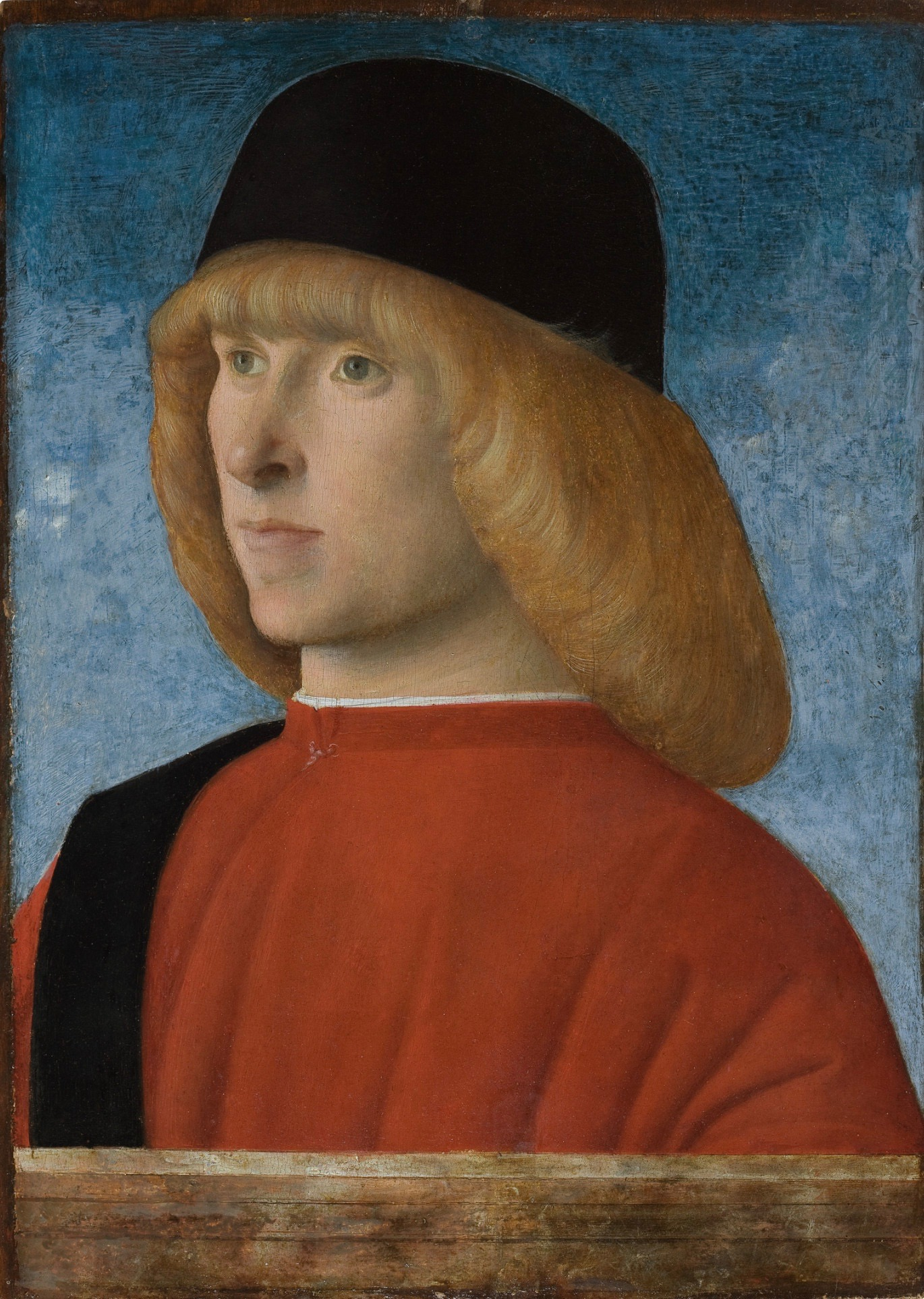
Portrait of Young Senator by Bellini

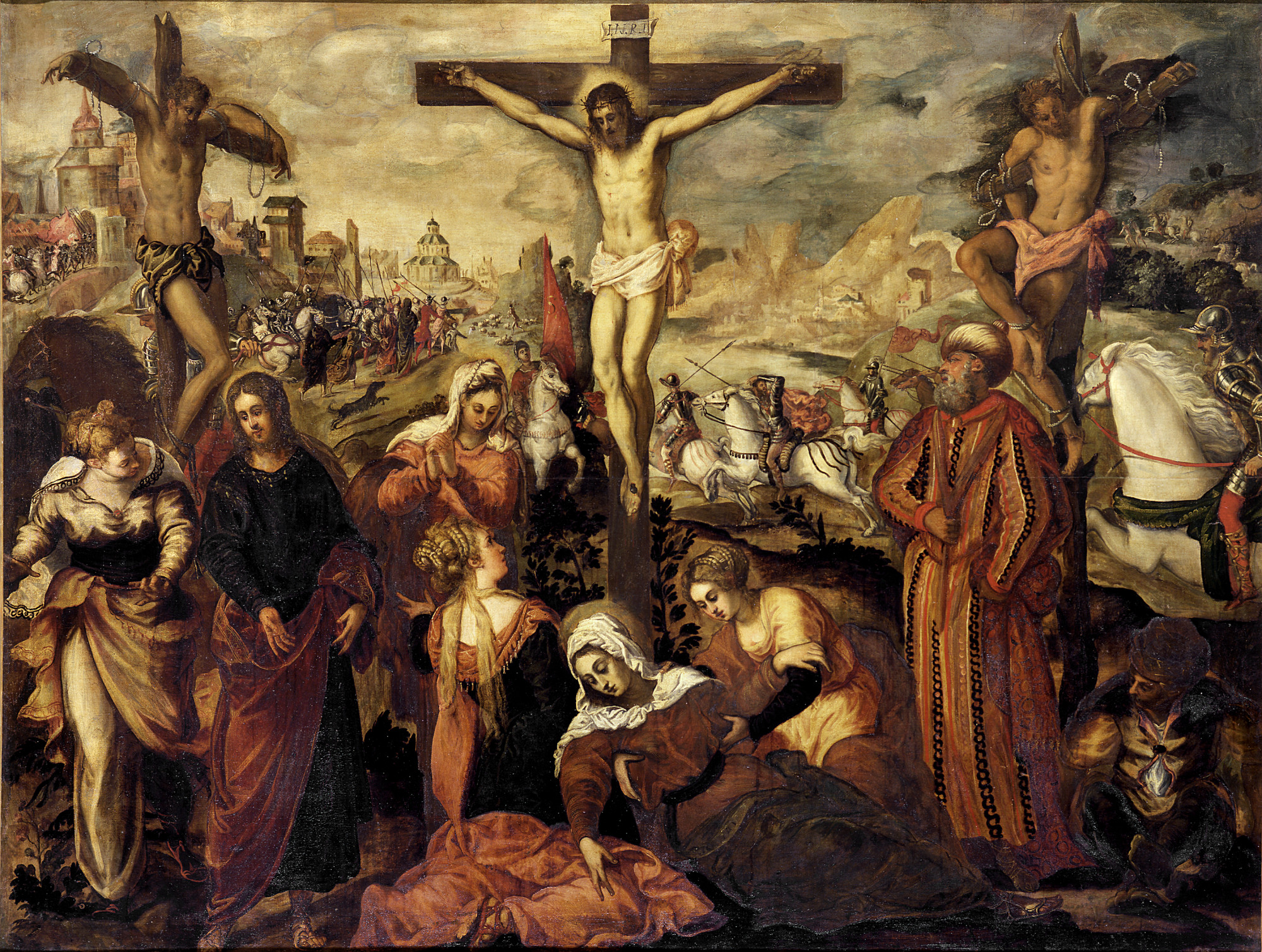
Crucifixion by Tintoretto

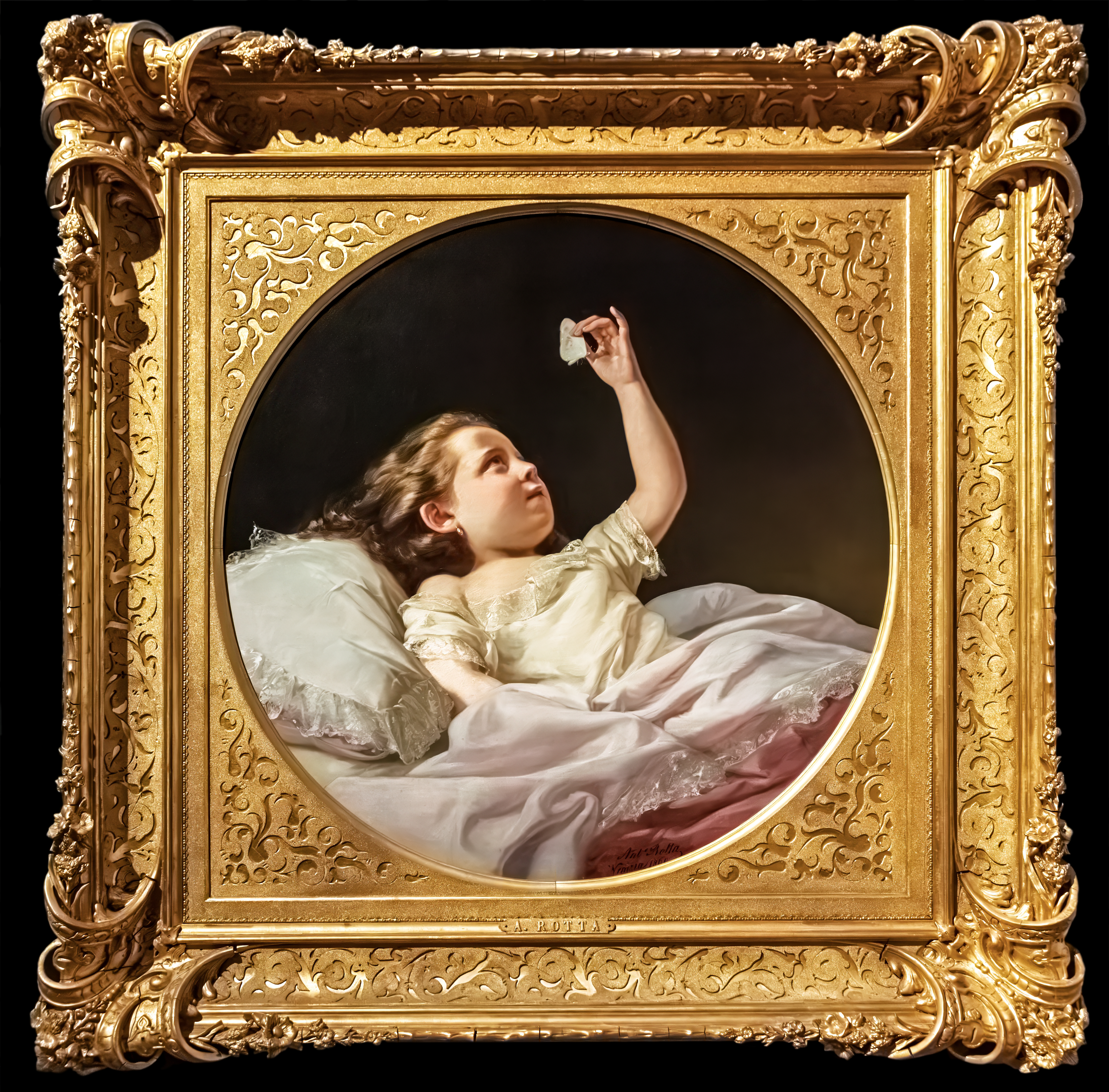
The little girl playing with a butterfly by Antonio Rotta

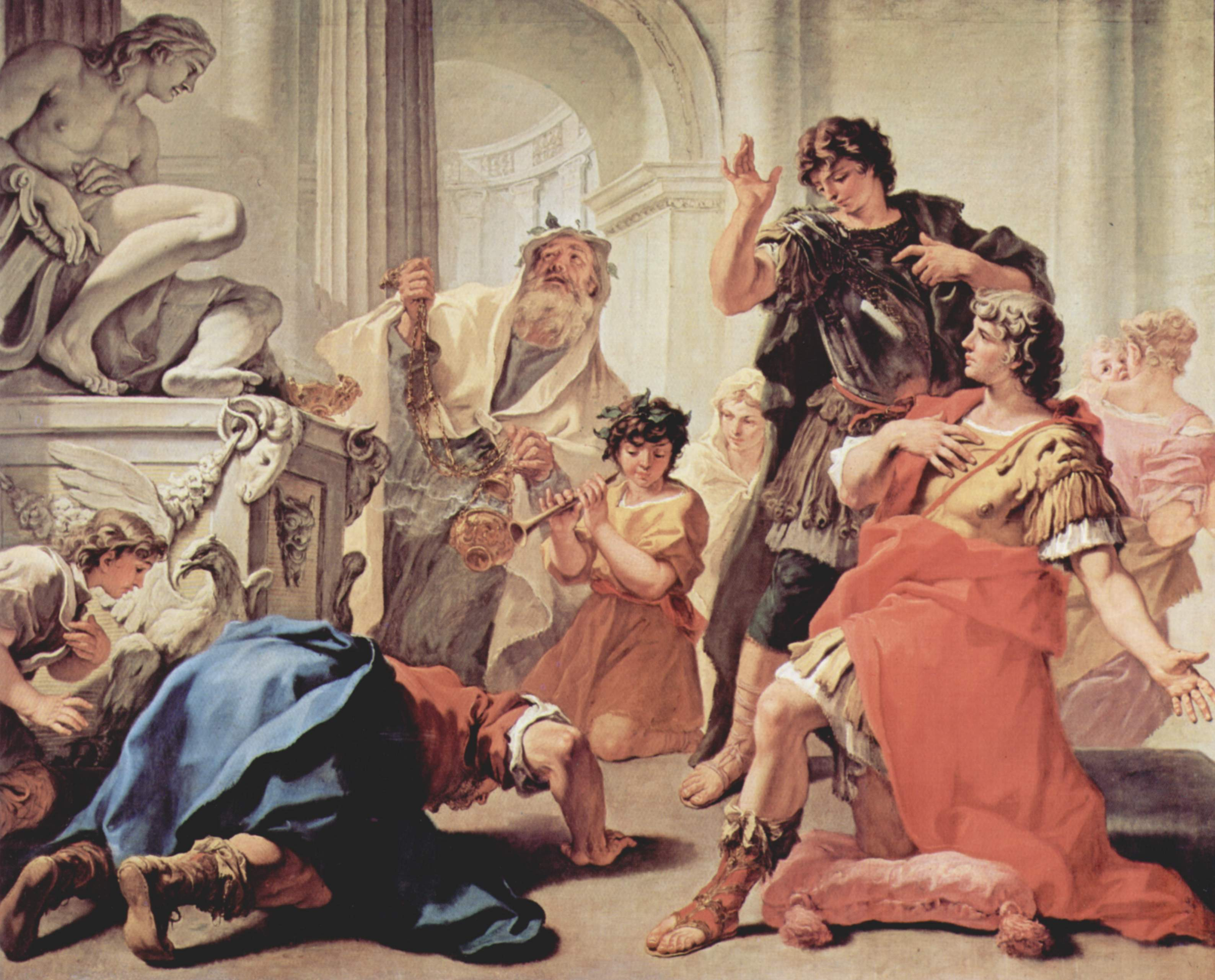
Lucius Junius Brutus at the Oracle of Delphi Kisses the Ground (Gaia) by Ricci

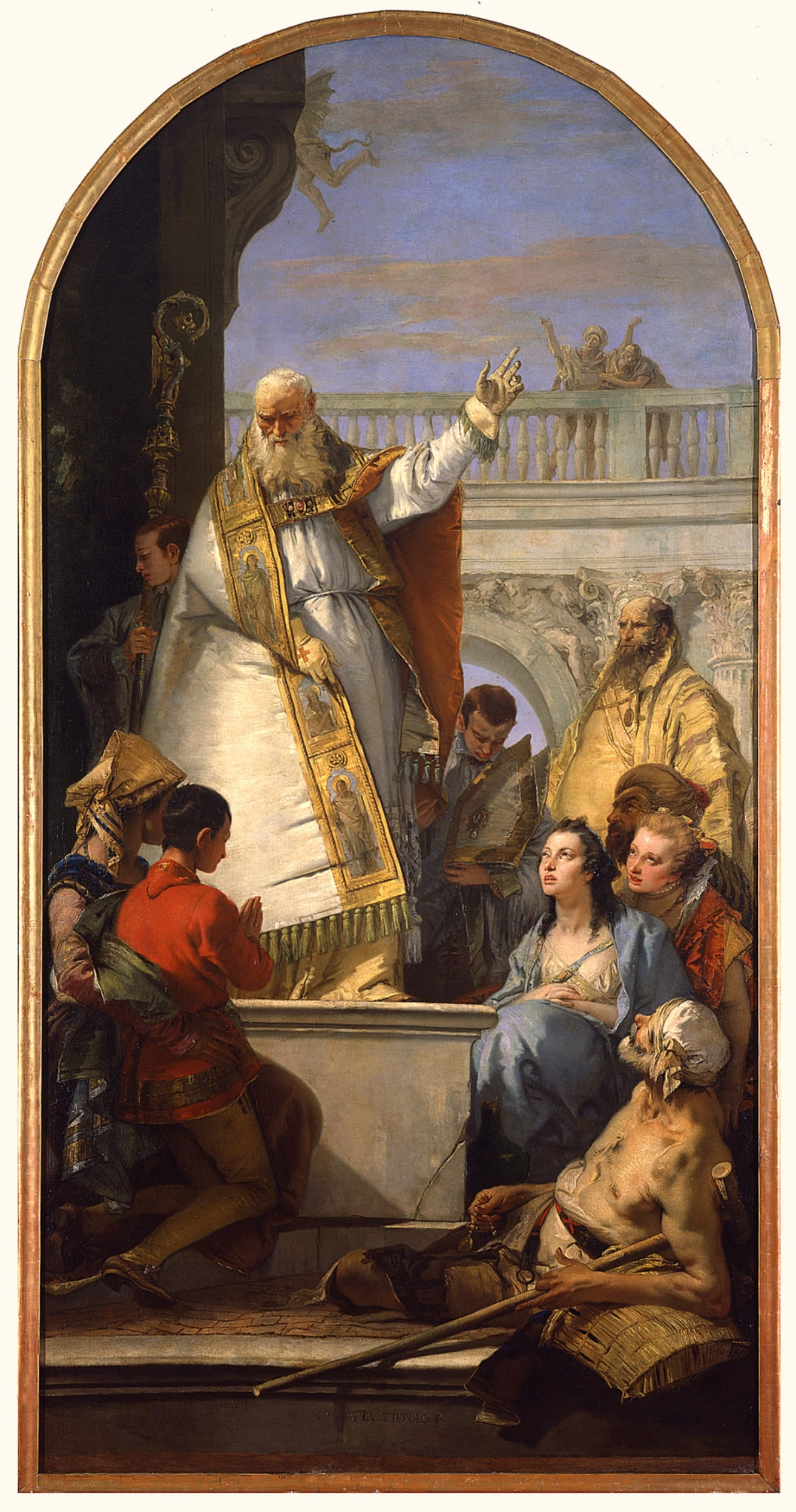
St Patrick by Tiepolo

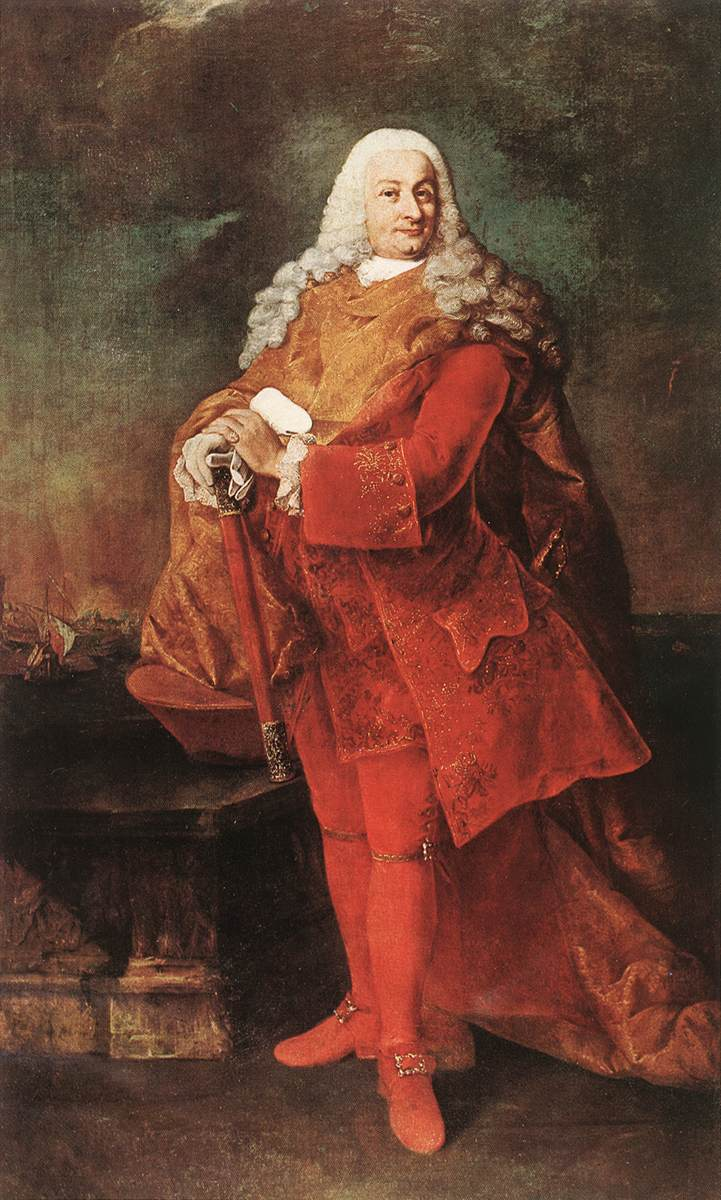
Portrait of Jacopo Gradenigo by Alessandro Longhi

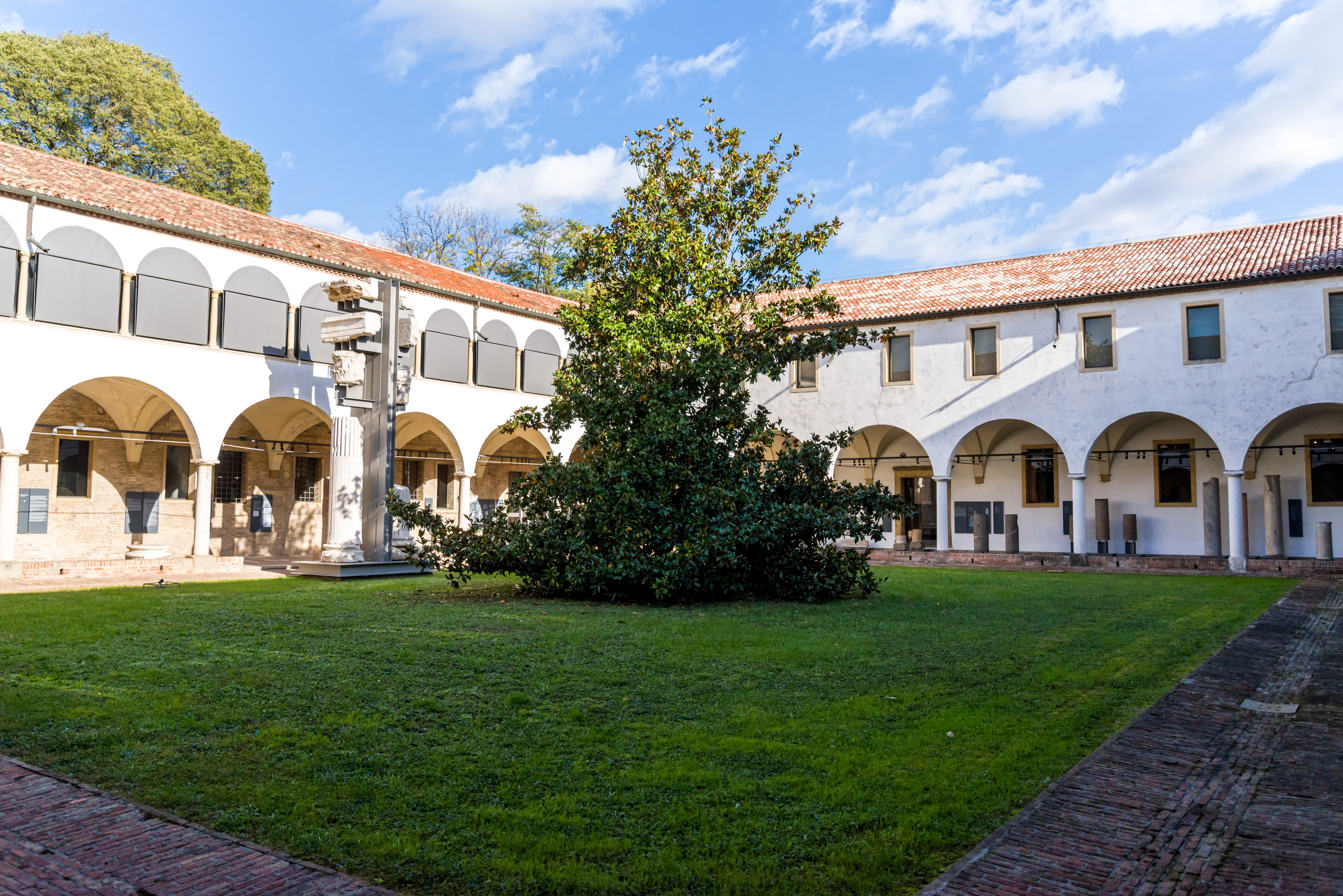
Courtyard of cloister with sculpture garden

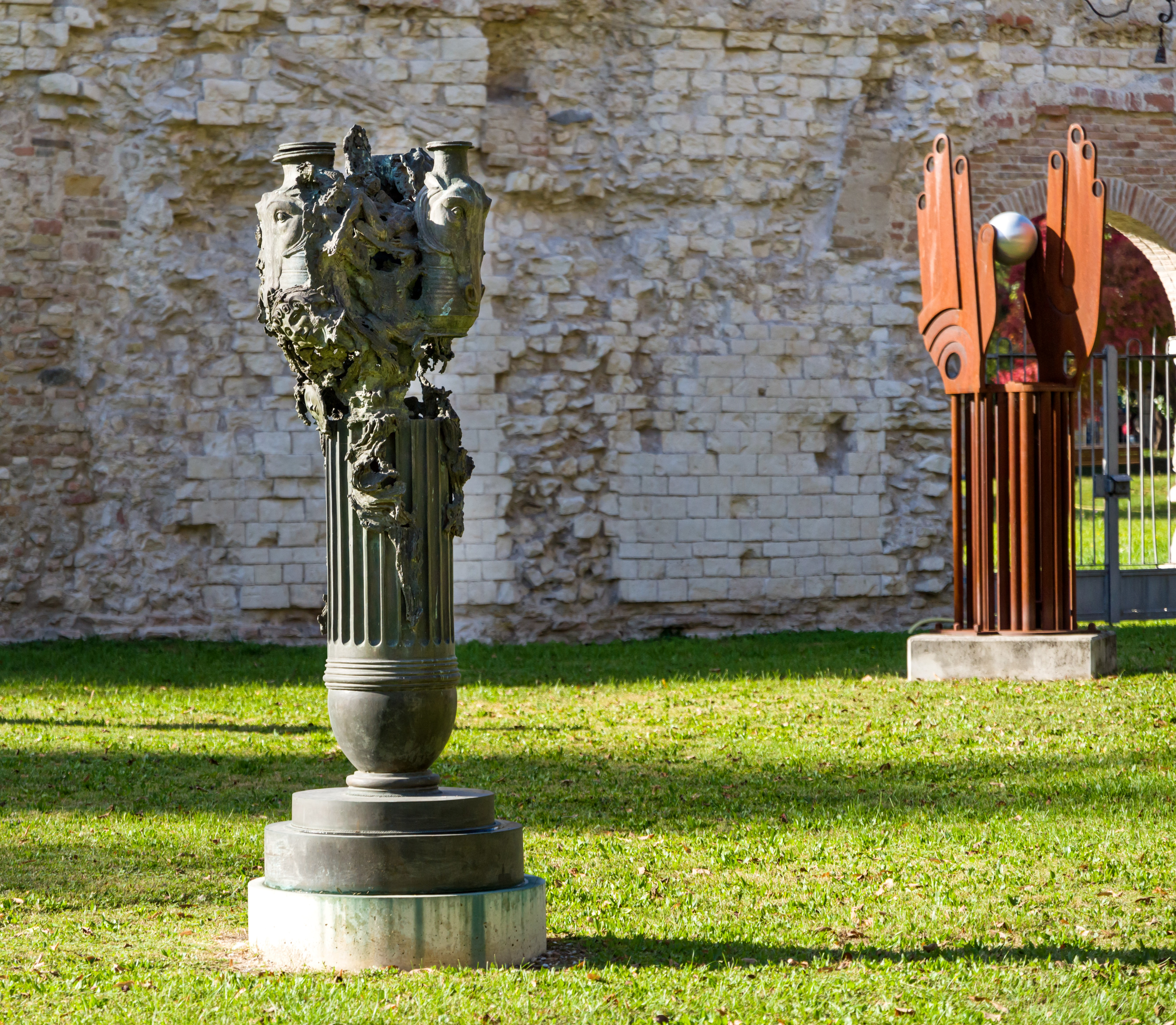
Sculpture Garden

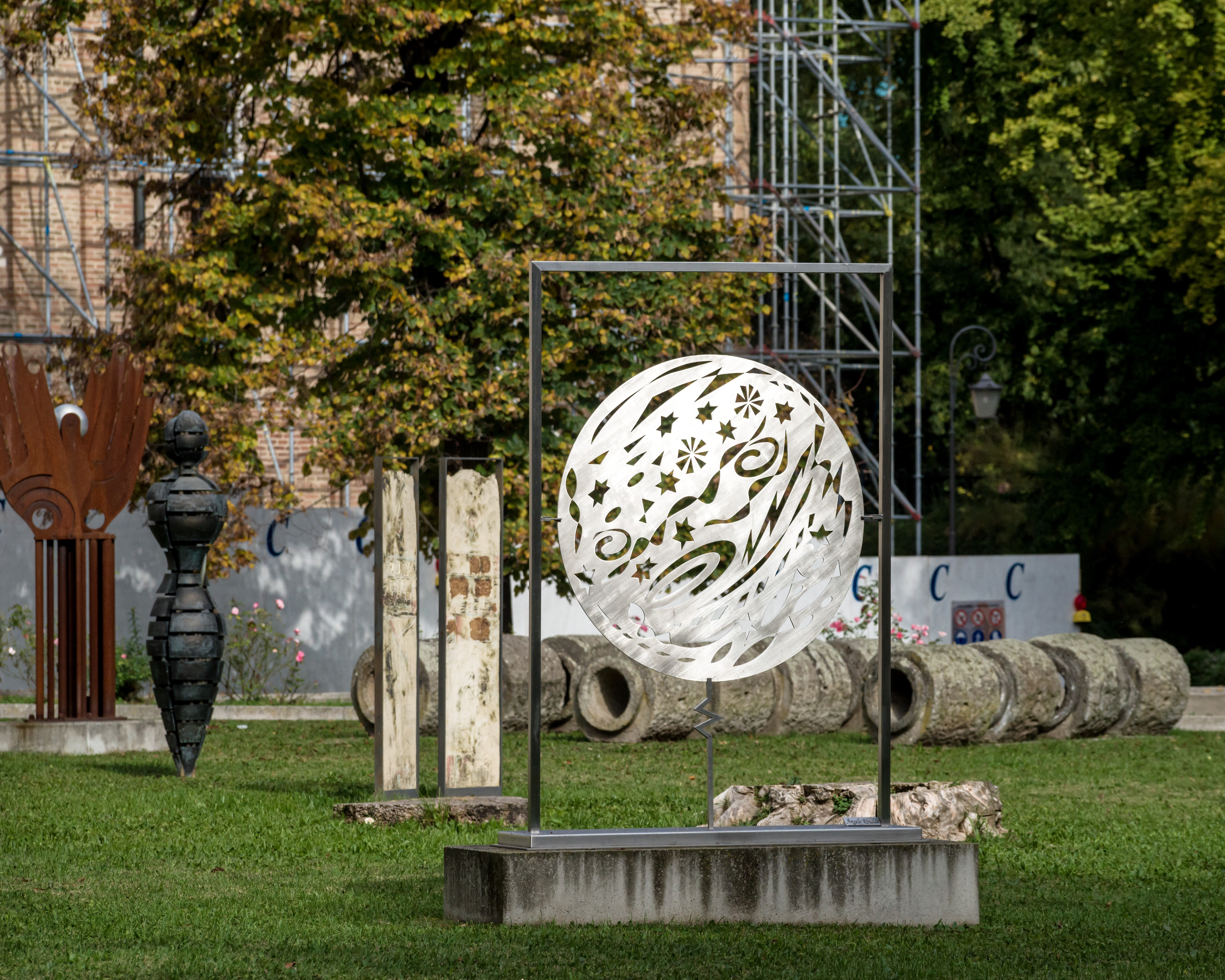
Sculpture Garden
