= Palazzo Zuckermann, Padua =

Coordinates: 45.4115°N 11.8782°E

The Palazzo Zuckermann is a palace located on corso Garibaldi in Padua, Italy. The building now houses the collections of the Museo di arti applicate e decorative (Museum of applied and decorative arts) on the first floor and the Museo Bottacin on the second floor; these collections form part of the Civic Museum of Padua. It stands across the street from the Cappella degli Scrovegni and the Museo agli Eremitani; the latter houses the main art gallery of the civic Museum of Padua.

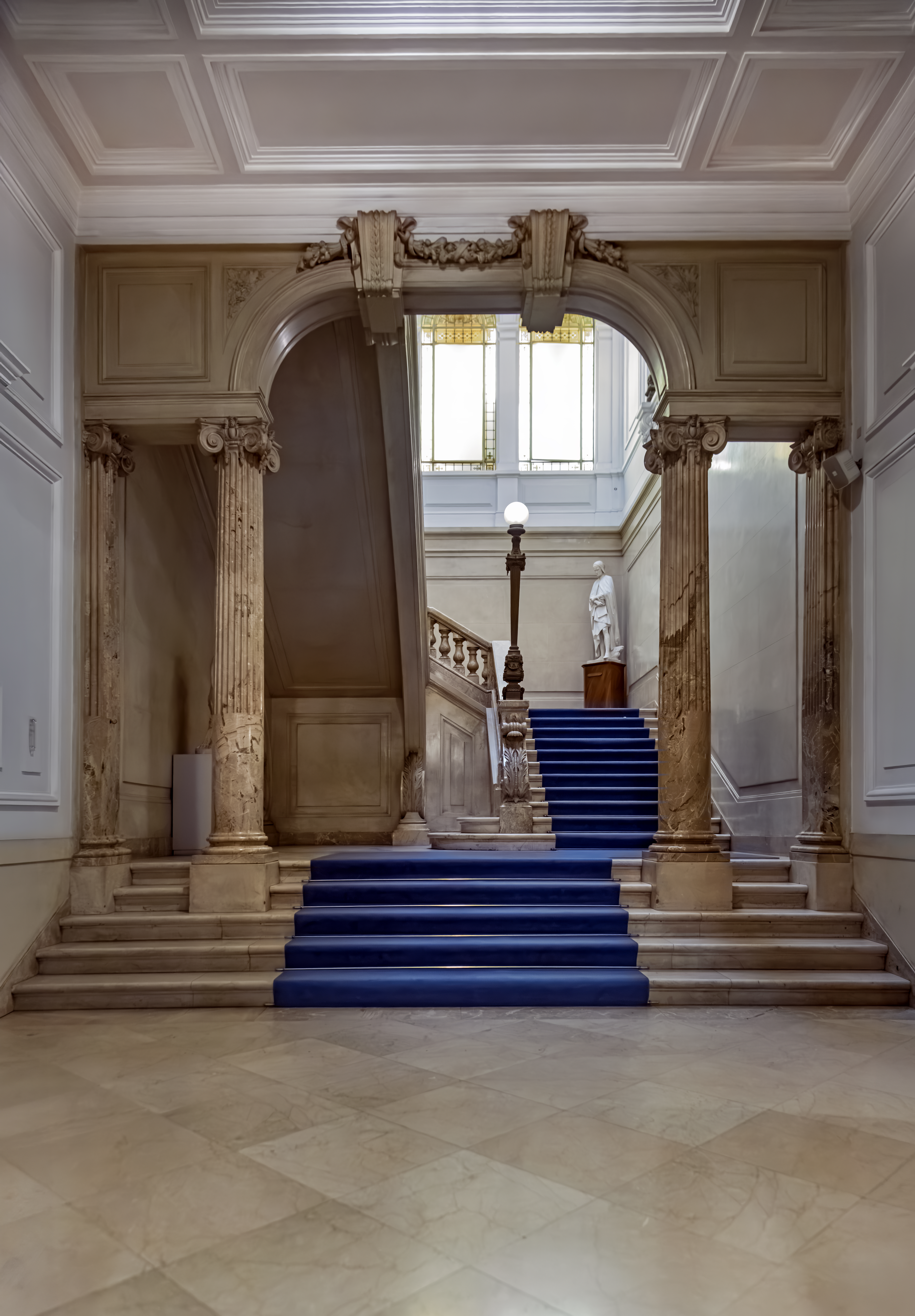
The entrance staircase of Palazzo Zuckermann

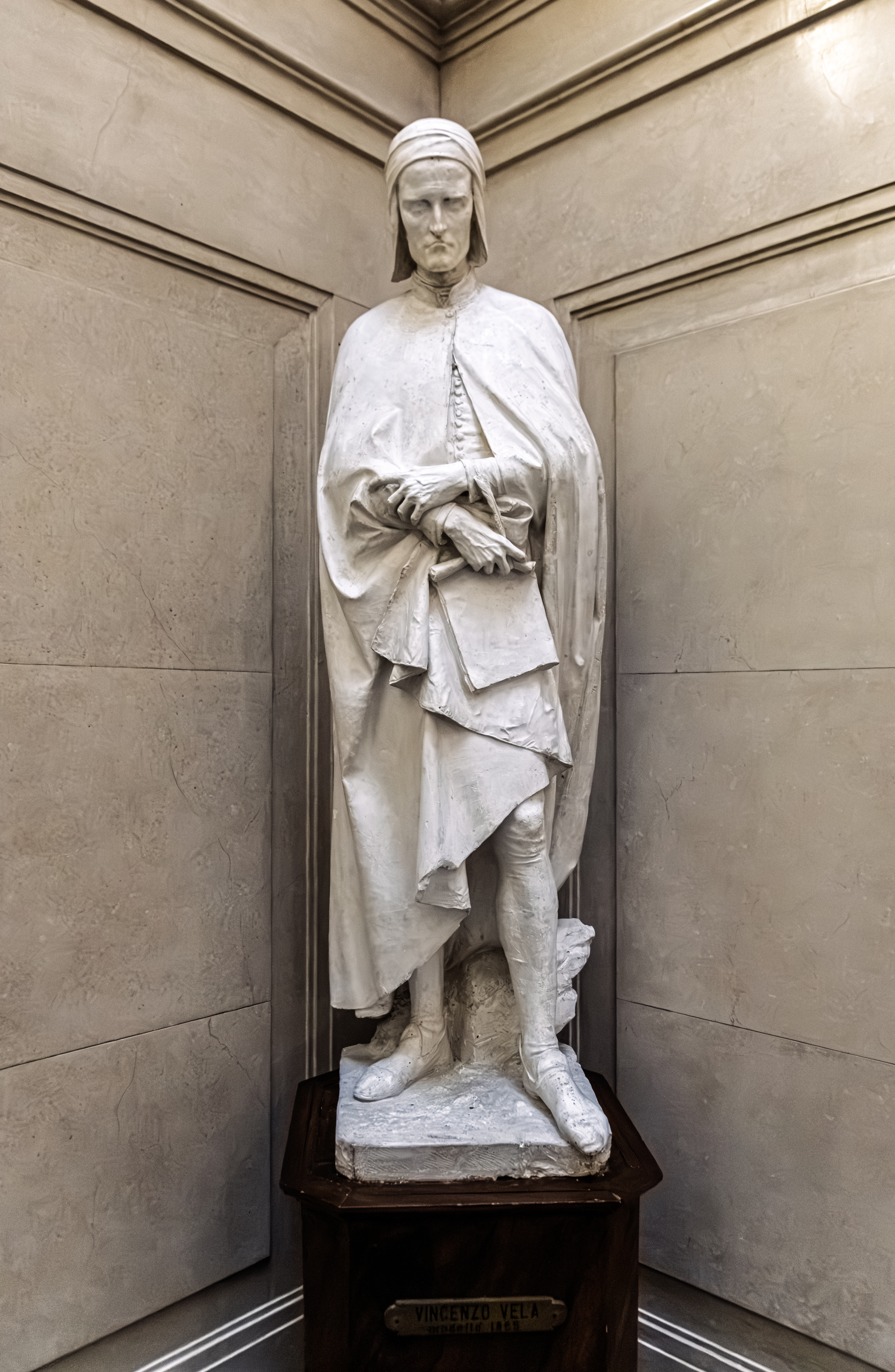
Dante Alighieri. Plaster statue by Vincenzo Vela - Grand Staircase

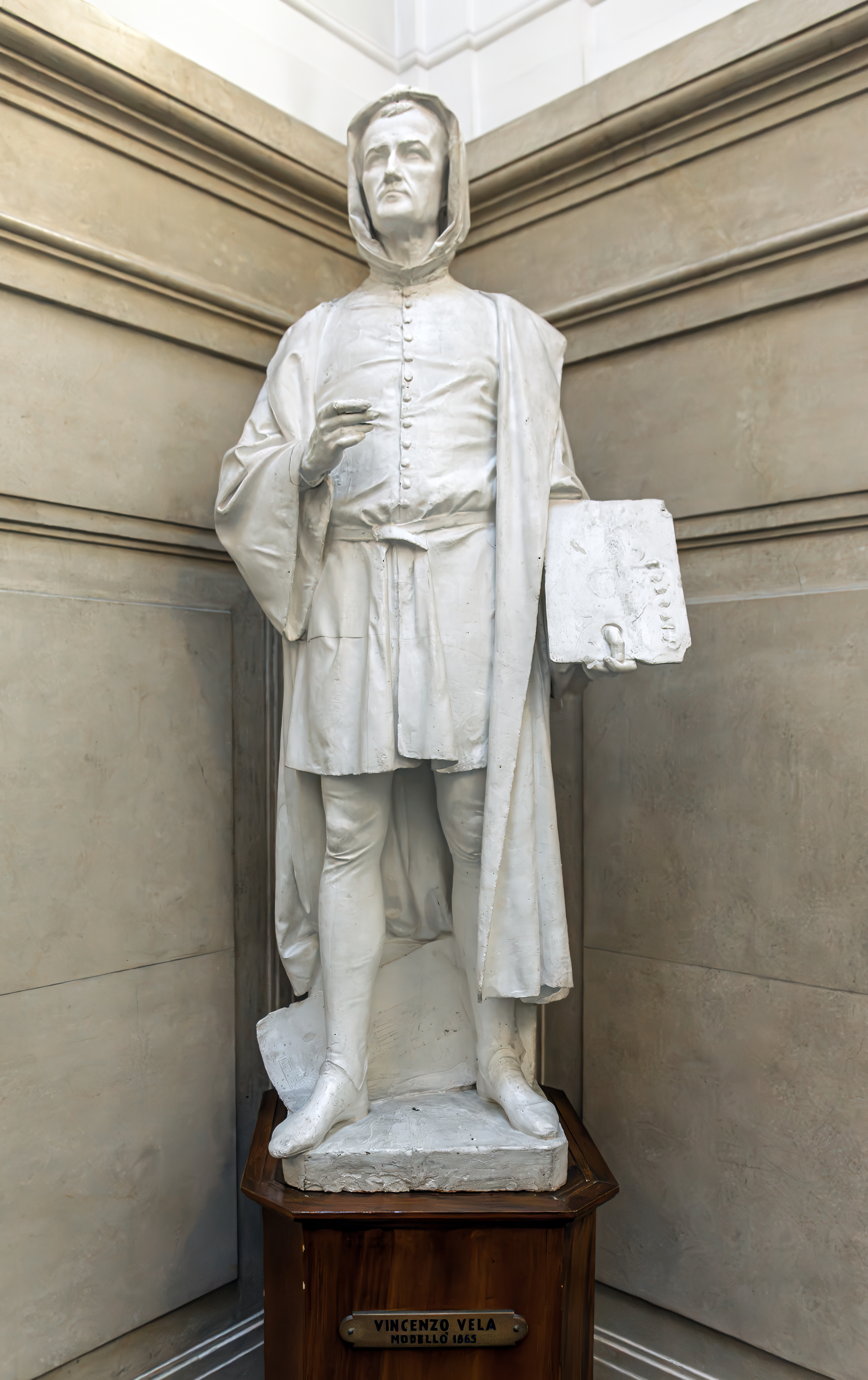
Giotto. Plaster statue by Vincenzo Vela - Grand escalier

The palace was commissioned by the wealthy industrialist Erico Zuckermann, and built by the architect Arosio in 1912–1914. In the 20th-century, the palace became used as the main post office building for Padua.

The Museo di arti applicate e decorative contains craftworks dating from the medieval to late 19th-century. The Museo Bottacin displays the eclectic collections donated to the city by the businessman Nicola Bottacin in 1865. It contains both paintings and sculptures, including from Antonio Rotta, Felice Schiavoni, Antonio Zona, Cristoforo Dall'Acqua, Gerolamo Induno, Pietro Magni, and Vincenzo Vela. The collection includes paintings and statuary, but is best known for its numismatic collections.

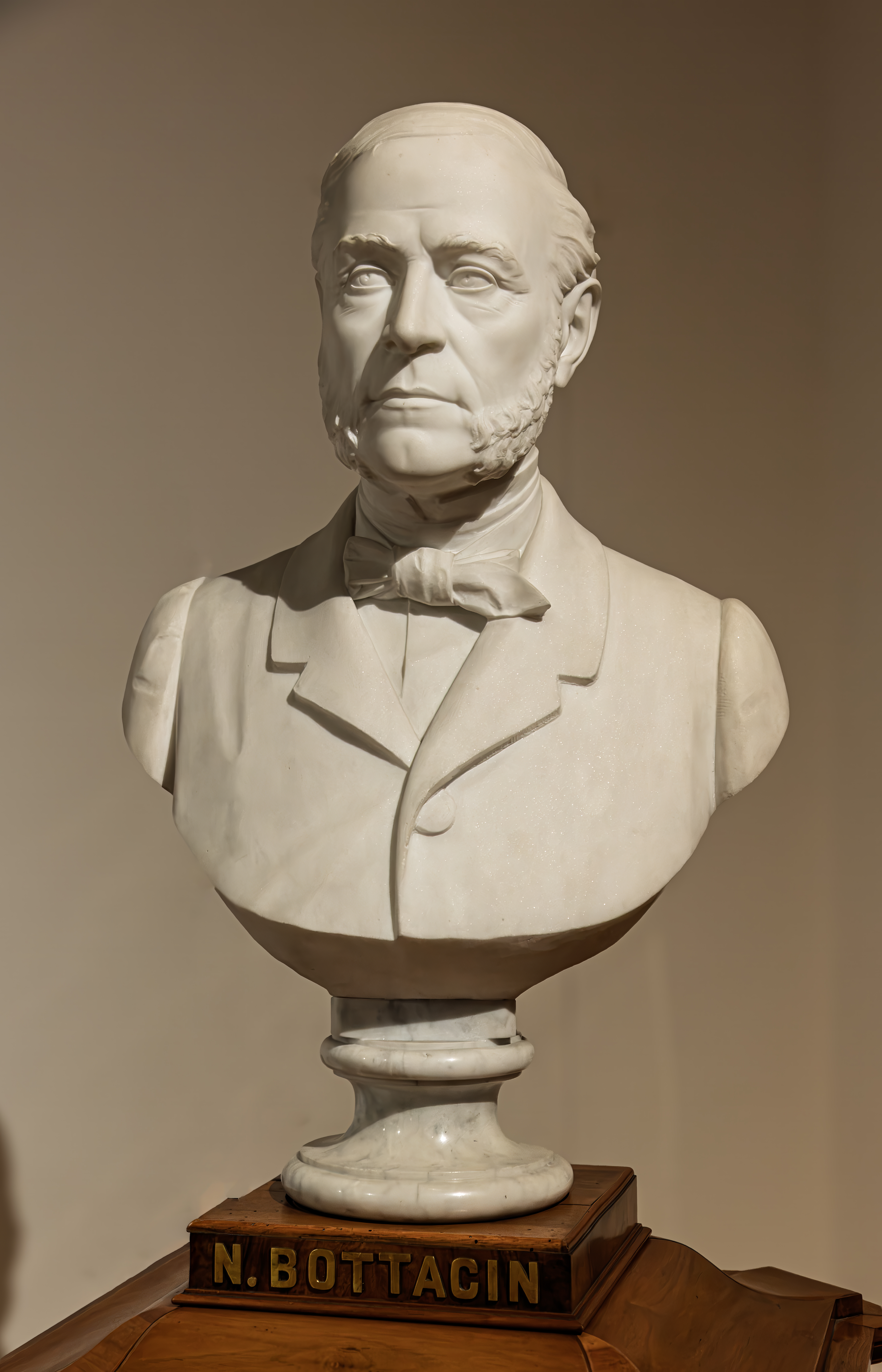
Bust of Nicola Bottacin

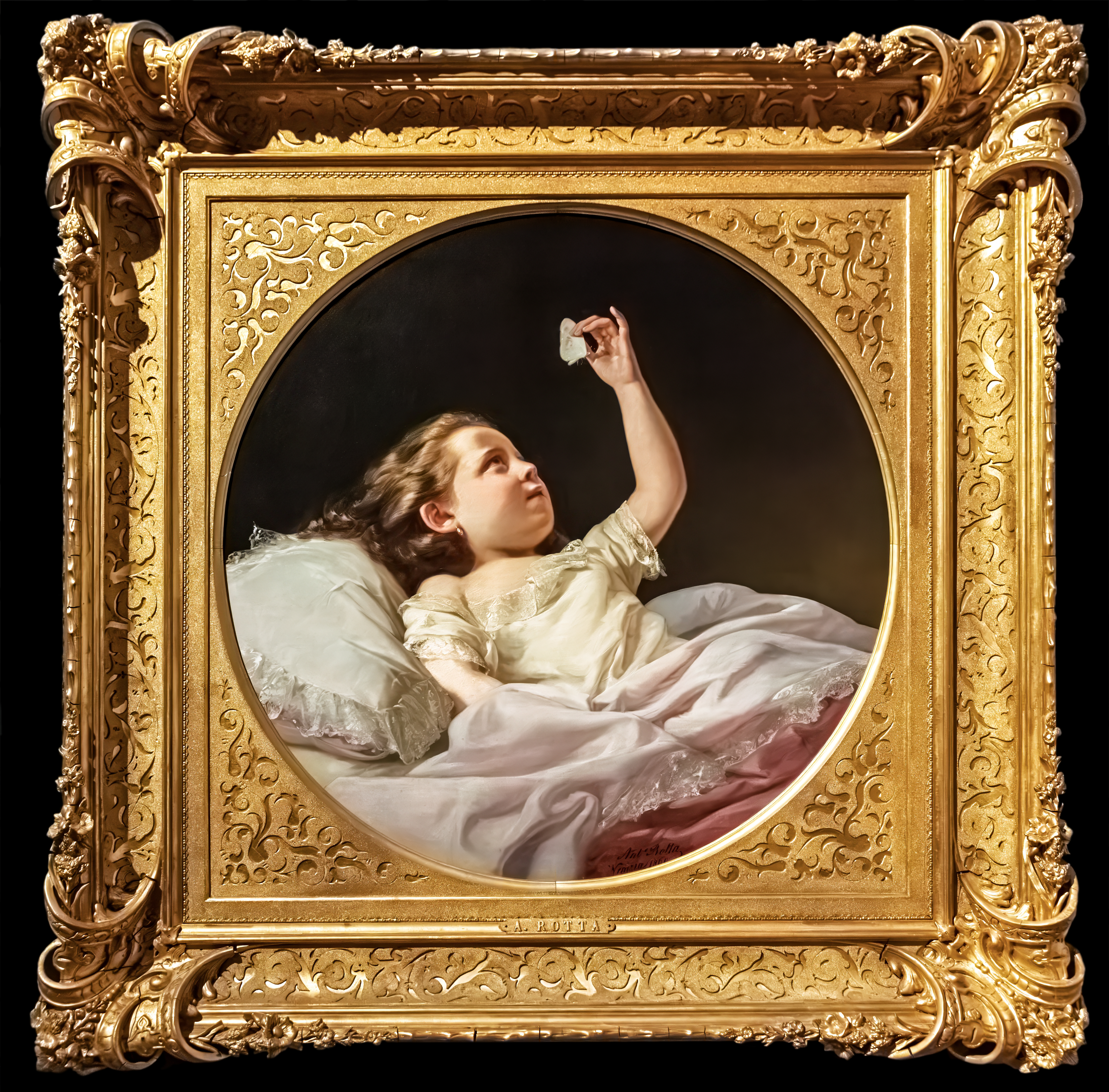
The little girl playing with a butterfly by Antonio Rotta, oil on canvas, 1860

“Plate” (by Wenzel Jamnitzer) (silver, gold)
