= Guariento di Arpo =

Italian painter

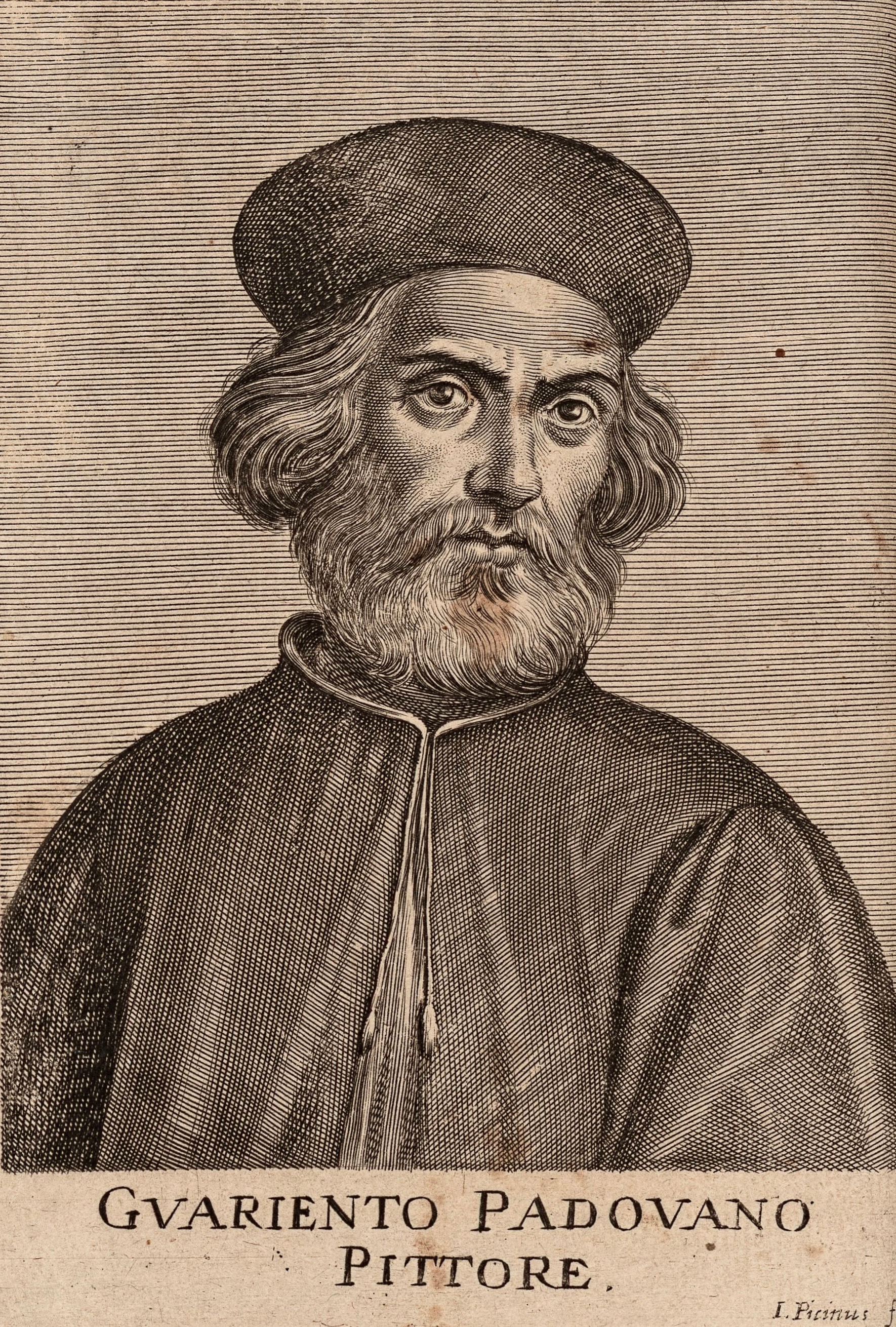
- Born: Guariento di Arpo c. 1310; Piove di Sacco
- Died: 1370

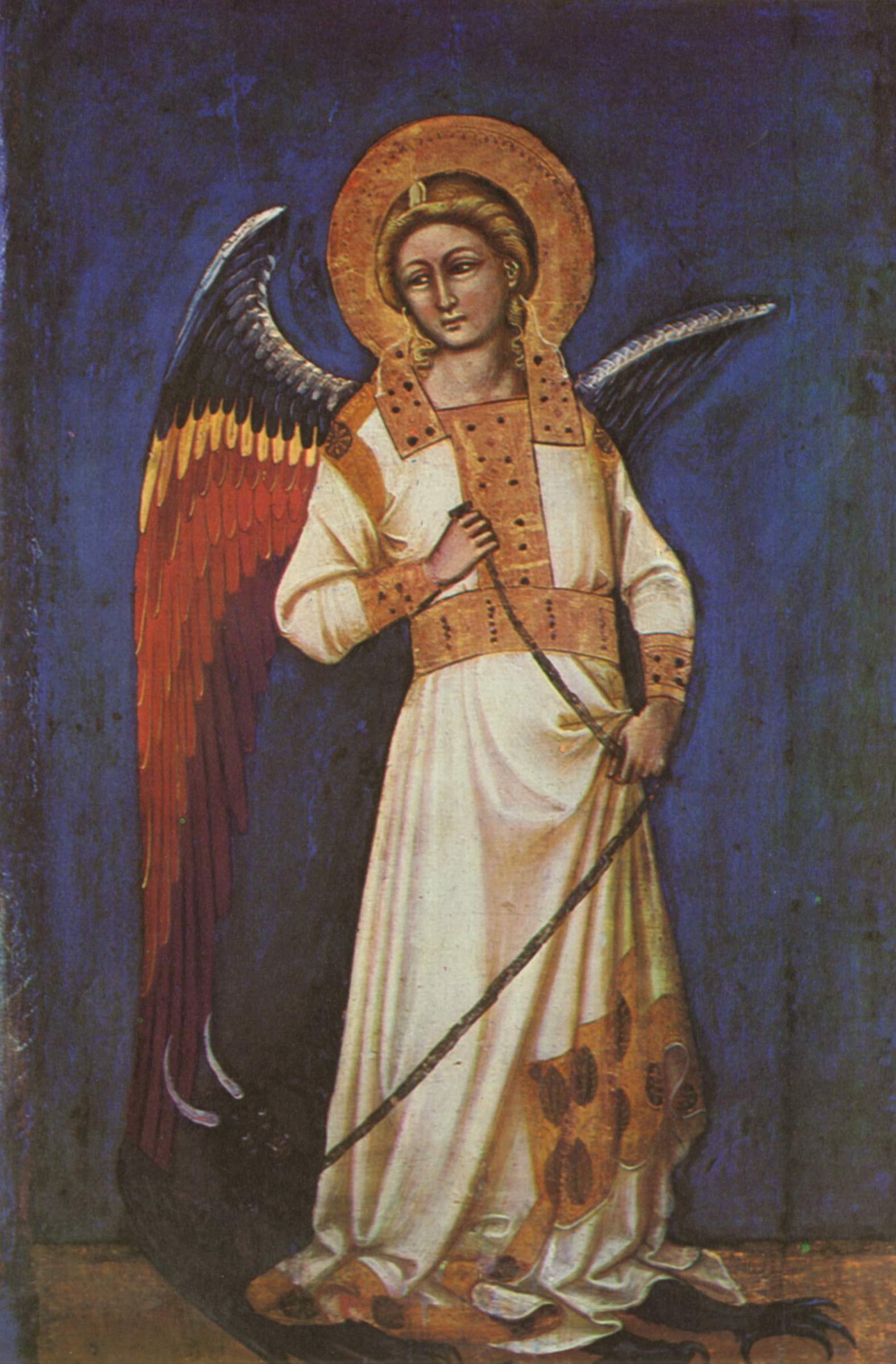
Angel, Musei Civici di Padova, Padua

Guariento di Arpo (1310 – 1370), sometimes incorrectly referred to as Guerriero, was a 14th-century painter whose career was centered in Padua. The painter is buried in the church of San Bernardino, Padua.

Guariento's major commissions in Padua include the choir frescoes for the Augustinian hermits' church of the Eremitani, which depict scenes from the life of St. Augustine, the order's founder. Painted in 1338, the cycle was severely damaged by the bombardment of 1944. Guariento also decorated the chapel of the Palazzo Carrara in Padua with panel paintings of the Madonna, St Matthew Evangelist and 25 angels. After the reconstruction of the palace in 1779 the panels were transferred to the Museo Civico of Padua. The decoration of the chapel is the subject of a recent study by Kornelia Mohl.

In 1365, having already acquired high renown in his native city, he was invited by the Venetian republic to paint a representation of the Coronation of the Virgin in the Palazzo Ducale, which survives in a fragmentary state, having been rediscovered underneath Tintoretto's Paradise when this was taken down for conservation in 1903.

Surviving works on panel include the Coronation of the Virgin altarpiece, dated to 1344 (Pasadena, Norton Simon Museum of Art); the Madonna of Humility dated to the 1340s (Los Angeles, J. Paul Getty Museum); the Madonna and Child from the 1360s (New York, Metropolitan Museum of Art); and the Ascension of Christ of 1344 (Venice, Collezione Vittorio Cini).

Guariento is generally viewed as the first artist to successfully combine the volumetric and spatial developments of Florentine painting of the early trecento with the more linear and abstract Late Gothic and Byzantine manner that had hitherto prevailed in the Veneto.
