= Vase with Irises Against a Yellow Background =

1889 painting by Vincent Van Gogh

- Irisar
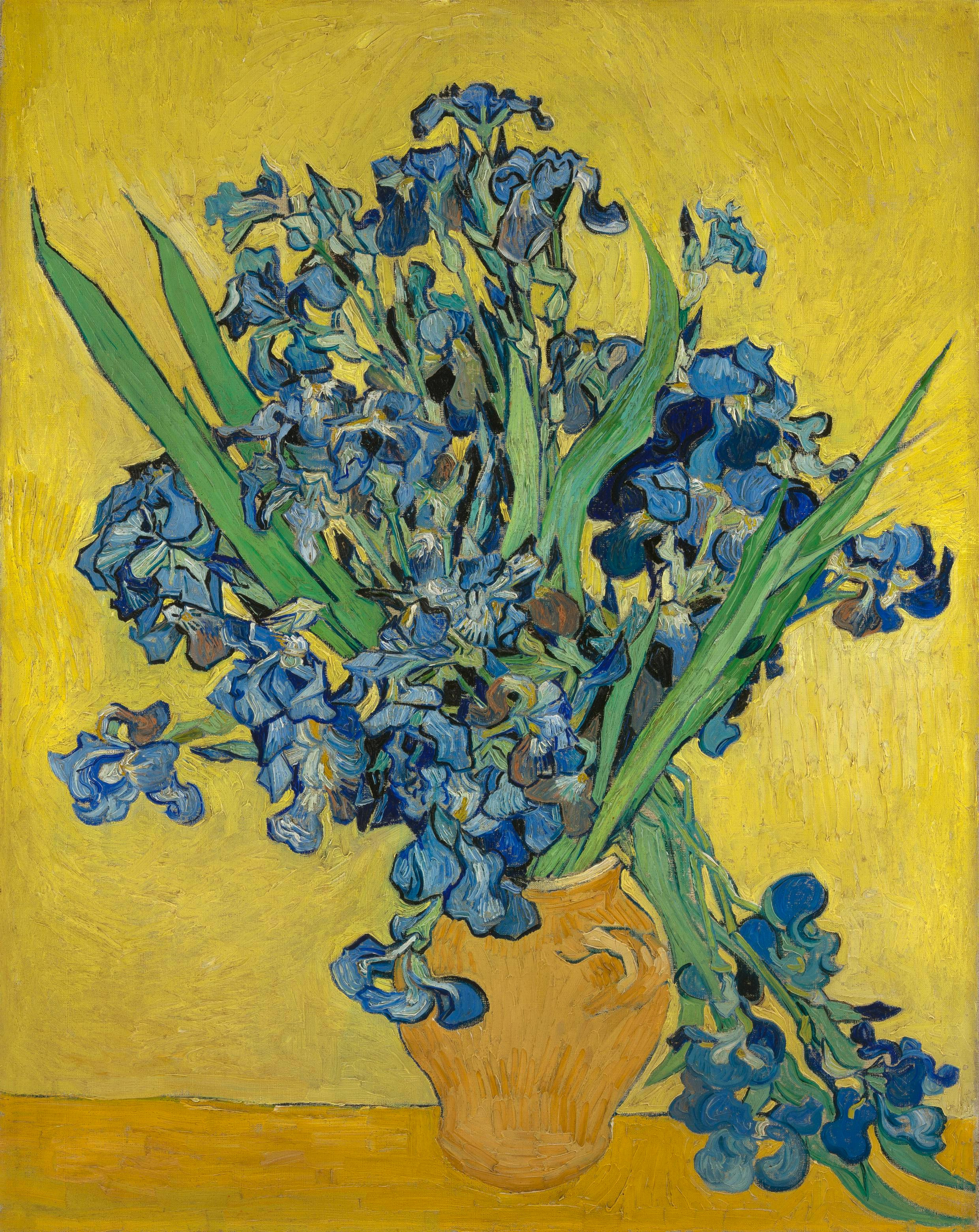
- Artist: Vincent van Gogh
- Year: 1889
- Catalogue: F687; JH1977
- Medium: Oil on canvas
- Dimensions: 73.5 cm × 92 cm (28.9 in × 36 in)
- Location: Van Gogh Museum; Amsterdam

Vase with Irises Against a Yellow Background is an oil painting on canvas made in 1889 by the painter Vincent Van Gogh. It is preserved in the Van Gogh Museum in Amsterdam. It is one of the works done while he was admitted to the psychiatric clinic in Saint-Rémy, a town near Arles.

Van Gogh has a similar work, with the same name, but also known as Vase with Iris, located in the Metropolitan Museum of Art in New York.

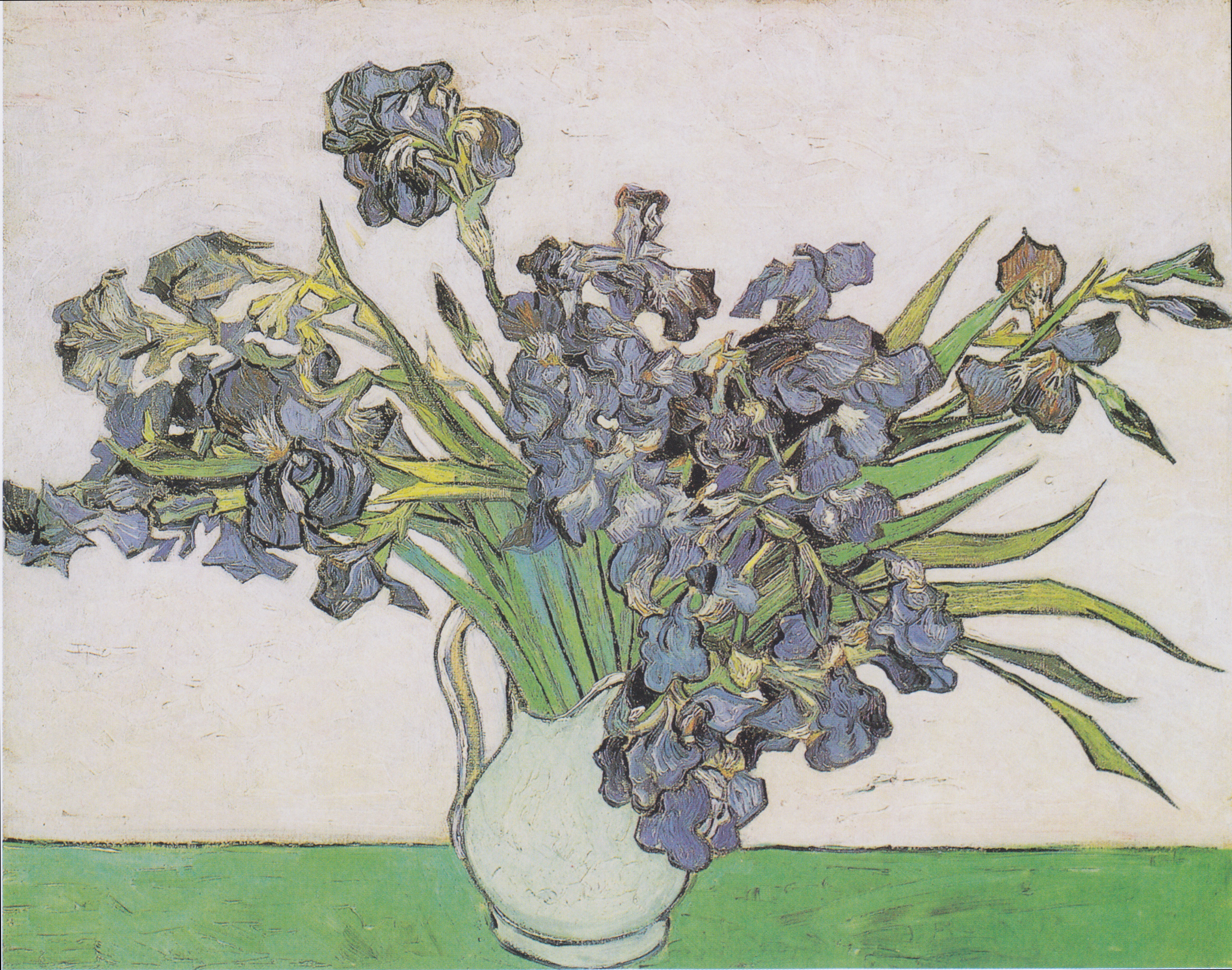
Vase with Iris, 1890, Vincent Van Gogh.

In this series of paintings about flowers (Vase with Cornflowers and Poppies, Vase with Pink Roses, Japanese Vase with Roses and Anemones) the influence of Japanese prints can be perceived, it is a theme that fascinated him during most of his artistic career and was very popular among the society of his time, which led him to eliminate the shadows and occupy much of the painting with dense flowers and their thick stems.

== See also ==
- List of works by Vincent van Gogh

== See also ==
- Post-Impressionism
