= Silvio Giulio Rotta =

Italian painter (1853–1913)

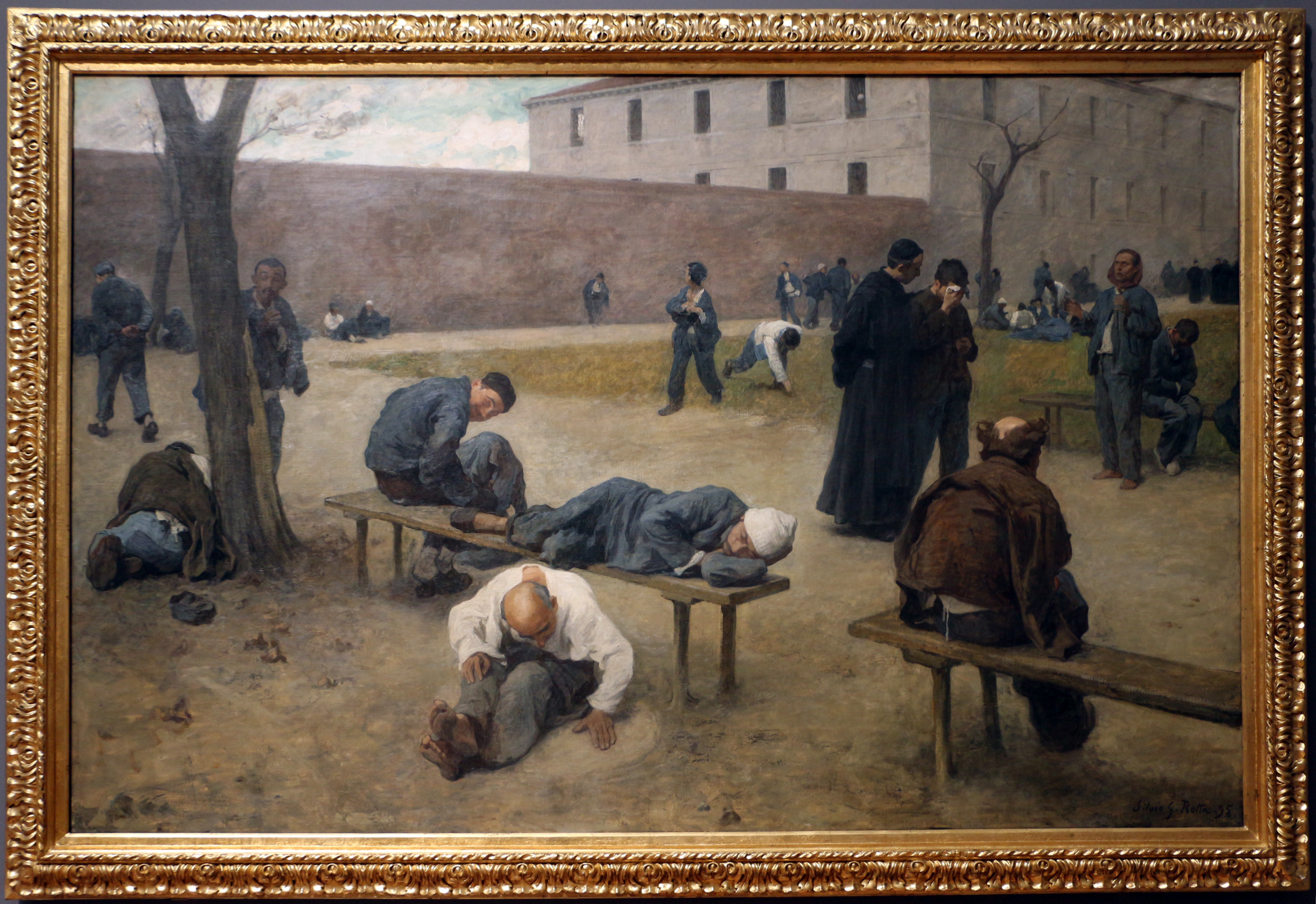
Noscomio (1895) by Silvio Rotta

Silvio Giulio Rotta (born in Venice, Austrian Empire,15 August 1853; died in Venice, 7 June 1913) was an Italian painter. While his first canvases were light watercolors of genre subjects in his native city, that is, the daily life of Venetians; his later career focused on realistic depictions of the darker side of human nature, including the interior of insane asylums.

== Biography ==
His father was the painter Antonio Rotta (born 1828 in Gorizia), who had studied at the Accademia di Belle Arti of Venice, and worked as genre painter.

One of his Silvio's works, Head of a Veteran, was a watercolor portrait completed at the age of thirteen. At the Exposition Universelle (1878) in Paris, he was awarded a gold medal for his painting of Costumi popolari veneziani. Among his other works at the exhibition were Raccolte della Cipolle a Sottomarina and Sulla Spiaggia del Lido.

After 1887, likely after a personal illness, his thematic became melancholic, even lugubrious. Another review merely describes the painter as having a Melancholic spirit and a mind tormented by artistic visions not always serene induced to depict subjects of a sorrowful and painful character. Examples of this change are the painting I forzati (prison laborers filing two by two from open-air fieldwork back to the confines of jail), which was displayed at the International Exposition of Venice, and receiving a golden medal at the Fine Arts Exposition in Budapest; also Abandoned Walls and in In the shadows (Nelle tenebre).

In 1895, at the first Biennale of Venice, the painting Nosocomio (Asylum) won an award. The realist painting in earth tones depicts the inmates of a mental asylum, in a wintry courtyard during recreation, sporting in a disarray of positions or actions. A dark priest and a confessor appear to be the only purposeful humans in the painting. The canvas was re-exhibited in 1900 in Paris. This is a topic that had been addressed by painters such as Signorini. Meanwhile, the worsening of Rotta's illness, diminished his output.

In 1912, he displayed his last major work, Nelle tenebre.
