= Antonio Rotta =

Italian painter (1828–1903)

- Born: 28 February 1828; Gorizia, Kingdom of Illyria
- Died: 10 or 11 September 1903; Venice, Italy
- Education: Accademia di Belle Arti di Venezia; Ludovico Lipparini
- Known for: genre painting, Venetian life
- Notable work: Il Ciabattino

Antonio Rotta (28 February 1828 – 10/11 September 1903) was an Italian painter, mainly of genre subjects.

== Biography ==
Rotta was born on 28 February 1828 in Gorizia in the Kingdom of Illyria, which was part of the Austrian Empire. He enrolled at the Accademia Reale di Belle Arti of Venice, where he studied under Ludovico Lipparini. His early genre paintings of Venetian scenes were followed by a number of religious and history paintings, among them Tiziano istruisce Irene di Spilimbergo ("Titian teaching Irene of Spilimberg"). He returned to genre painting, and produced many scenes of Venetian life, often featuring children. One of the best-known of these was Il Ciabattino, "the cobbler".

Many of his works were sold abroad. In 1891 he exhibited in Berlin.

Rotta was married to a daughter of Lattanzio Querena; they had a son, the painter Silvio Giulio Rotta.

Rotta died in Venice on 10 or 11 September 1903.

== Gallery ==
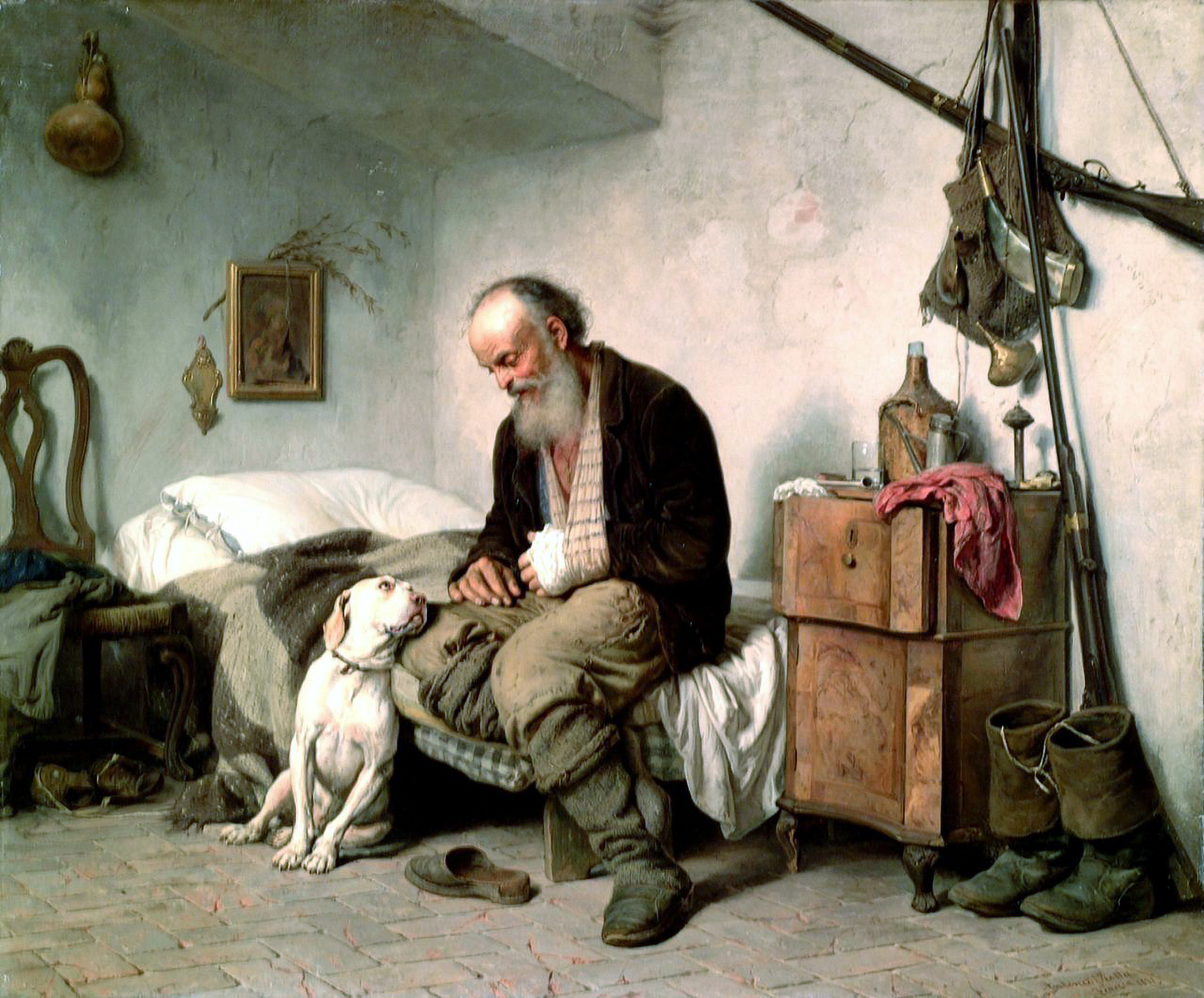
The Hunter, 1872

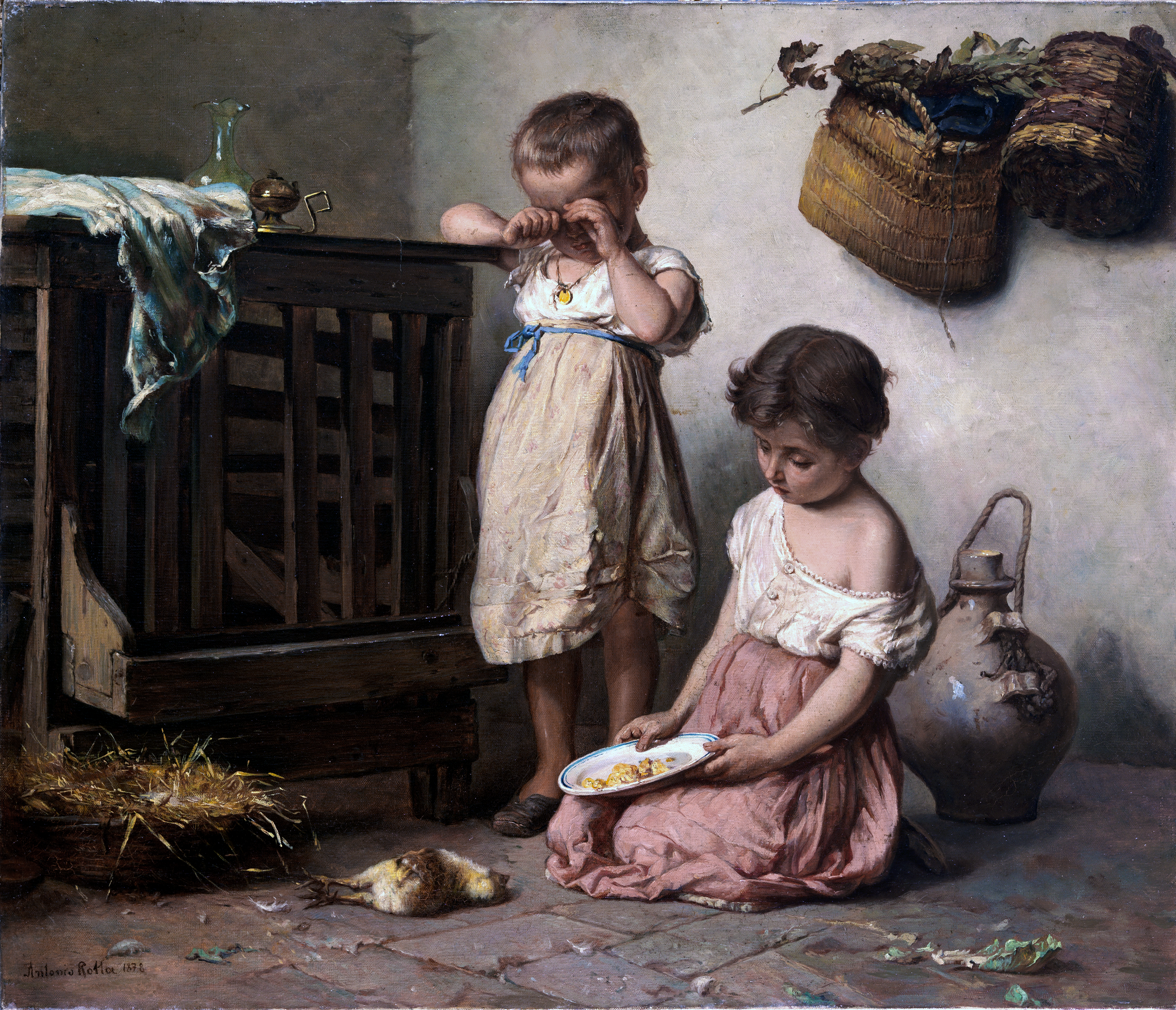
The death of the chick, 1878

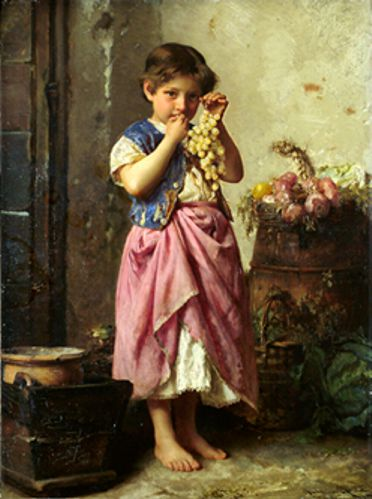
Child and grapes, 1884
