= Giuseppe Jappelli =

Italian architect (1783–1852)

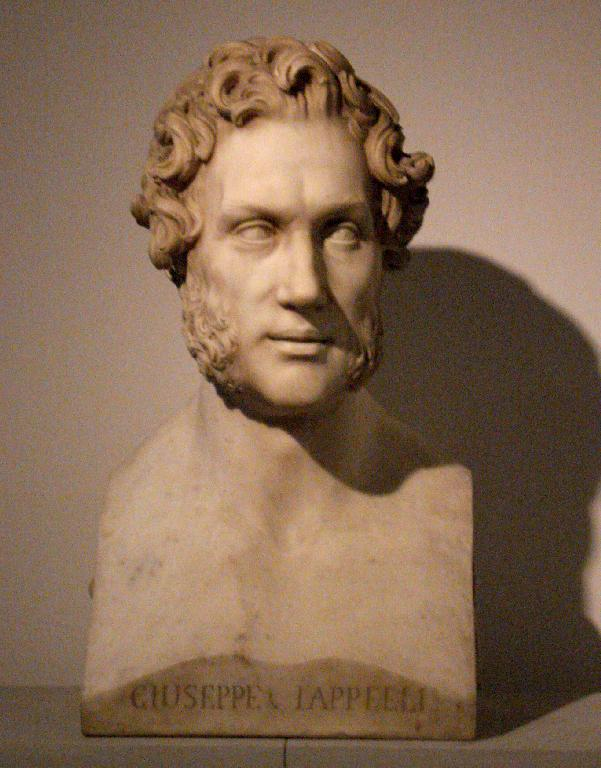
- Bust of Giuseppe Jappelli
- Born: 14 May 1783; Venice, Republic of Venice
- Died: 8 May 1852 (aged 68); Venice, Kingdom of Lombardy–Venetia
- Occupation: Architect
- Movement: Neoclassicism
- Spouse: Eloisa Pietrobelli (m. 1817)
- Buildings: Pedrocchi Café

Giuseppe Jappelli (14 May 1783 – 8 May 1852) was an Italian neoclassic architect and engineer who was born and died in Venice, which for much of his life was part of the Austrian Empire. He was a prominent Neoclassical architect but was also a noted eclectic, much admired, for example, by Pietro Selvatico, and he introduced the taste for the romantic garden to Italy.

== Biography ==
=== Early life and education ===
Giuseppe Jappelli was the youngest of nine children born to Domenico Jappelli and cousin to Luigi Jappelli, a painter and interior decorator. He attended courses in architecture and figure drawing at the Accademia Clementina, Bologna (1789–9). This school, which was in the forefront of theatre design and technique, provided a stimulating and enlightened cultural environment; his teachers included Angelo Venturoli and Francesco Tadolini.

=== Early career ===
After obtaining his diploma in 1800, he moved to Padua, and in 1803 he entered the studio of Giovanni Valle, a mapmaker, where he became a qualified surveyor. He collaborated with the engineer Paolo Artico between 1804 and 1806 on defence works on the River Piave, and in 1807, with the architect Daniele Danieletti (1756–1822), he restored the old prison in Carrara Castle. The same year he was also appointed as an engineer in the Regio Corpo di Acque e Strade in the Brenta region. His works of this period included decorating the town hall (1809) in Padua for the unveiling of a painting by Francesco Alberi dedicated to Napoleon. In 1813 he enrolled in the French Army and was promoted to the post of captain in the entourage of Eugène de Beauharnais.

=== Austrian rule ===
After the end of Napoleonic rule in Italy in 1814, Jappelli concentrated on restructuring in the English style the Sommi Picenardi park, Cremona. He returned to Padua when it was annexed to the Kingdom of Lombardy–Venetia in 1815, and on the occasion of the visit of the Emperor of Austria, Francis I, and his consort, Maria Ludovika, he designed the decorations for the great hall in the Palazzo della Ragione, creating a ‘romantic garden’ there for the night of 20 December 1815.

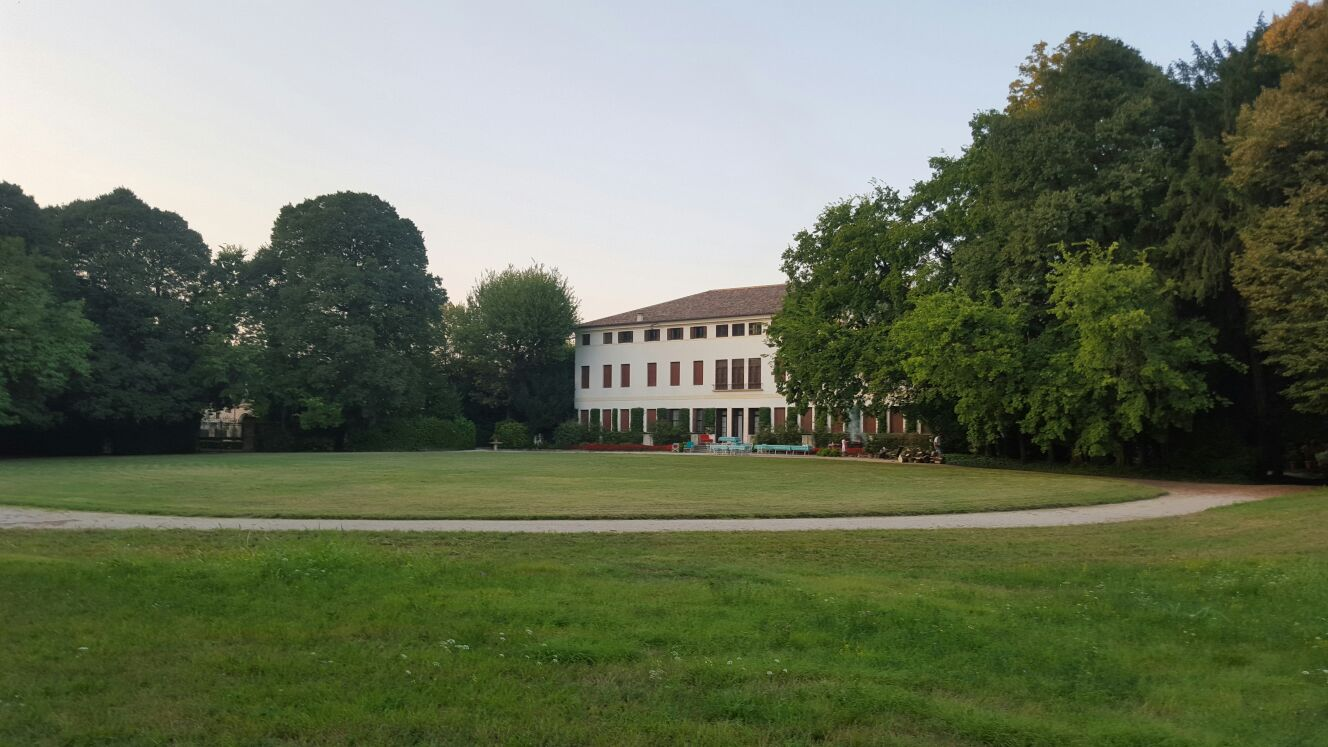
Park of Cittadella-Vigodarzere

This famous event confirmed his reputation as a creator of gardens, and in 1816 he began work on gardens at Sant'Elena di Battaglia for Agostino Meneghini and the park of Cittadella-Vigodarzere (now Valmarana) at Saonara, near Padua, for Antonio Vigodarzere. The latter contained all the theatrical ingredients typical of the romantic tradition: the studied use of clumps of vegetation, a lake, a grotto and an artificial hill. Its most renowned feature, however, was the Gothic Revival chapel of the Templars (completed 1833), incorporating complex masonic symbolism. The grotto was decorated with papier-mâché stalactites and was dominated by a great statue of Baphomet, a hermaphrodite idol and tutelary god of the Gnostic sect. The sculptor Rinaldo Rinaldi, with Luigi Ferrari (1810–94) and Natale Sanavio (1827–1905), collaborated on the building using such materials as wood, stucco and papier mâché, associated with stage sets.

In 1817 Jappelli married Eloisa, daughter of Conte Pietro Petrobelli, a well-known Jacobin militant, and joined the Masonic lodge, frequenting the city’s radical and pro-Jacobin circles. Between 1819 and 1821 he executed an important public commission, the municipal abattoir (now the Istituto d’Arte Pietro Selvatico), in Padua between the canal of Santa Sofia and the River Piovego. With an impressive Doric portico, it was designed according to the new health regulations established under the Napoleonic Code; it had a triangular plan, in the centre of which was a large circular courtyard for the slaughtering and a machine for drawing water from the Piovego. The contemporary debate on the suitability of styles and the functional use of the Greek Revival explains Jappelli’s stylistic choice, which was also partly influenced by his studies at Paestum, as several of his drawings in the Musei Civici di Padova show.

While involved in planning the abattoir he was also preparing plans for the Palazzo Comunale of Piove di Sacco. Jappelli’s most interesting architectural and urban-planning projects were produced after 1822: plans for a new prison, a university complex overlooking the district of Prato della Valle and a new street layout for Padua; designs for the Loggia Amulea (executed 1861) and for Antonio Pedrocchi’s café in Padua; and the rebuilding of the spa of Abano Terme.

=== Pedrocchi Café ===
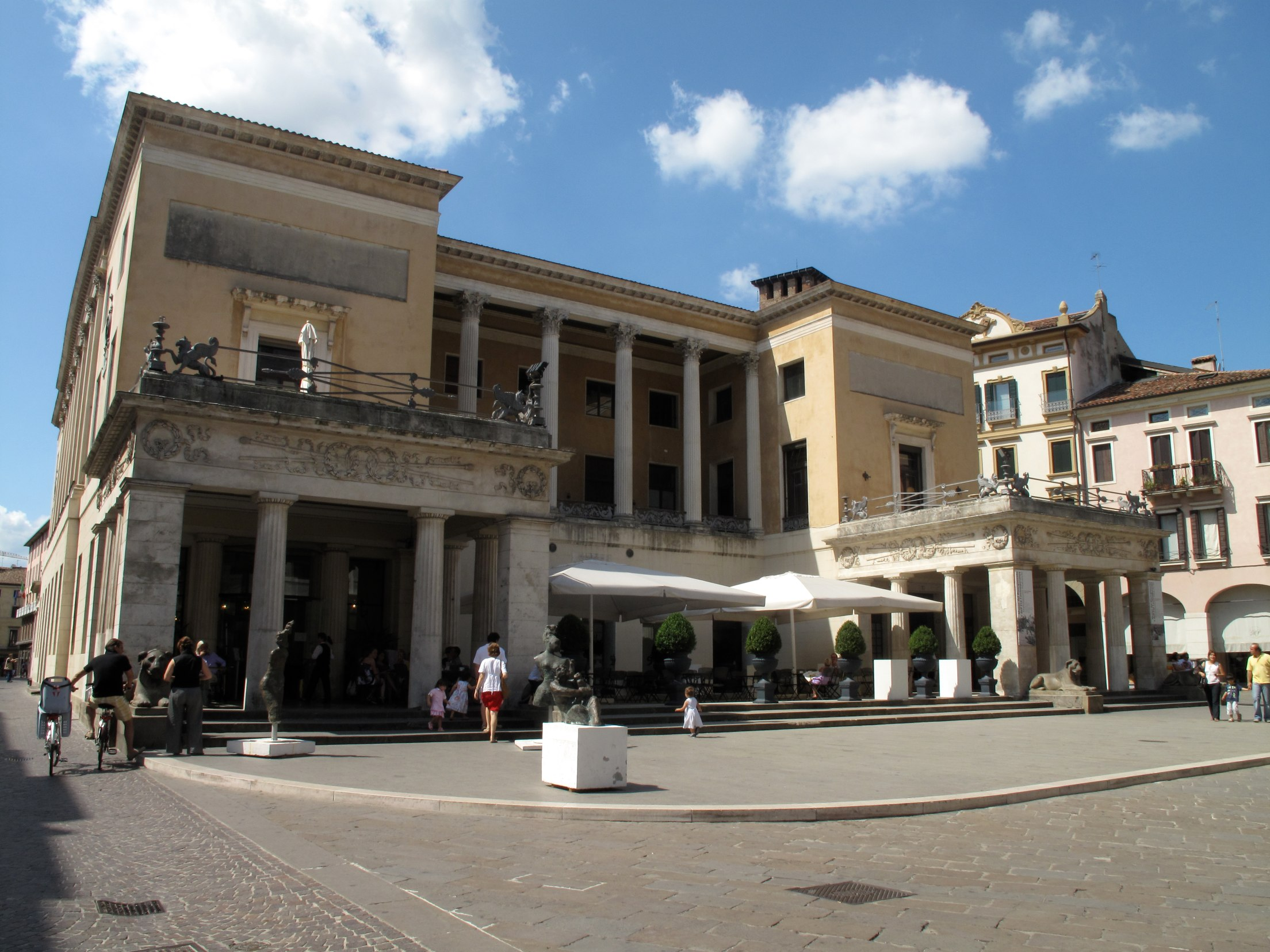
The Pedrocchi Café in Padua

The Pedrocchi Café in Padua, one of Jappelli’s most important private commissions, was begun in 1826 and completed between 1831 and 1842. An engineer, Giuseppe Bisacco, was initially employed as director, but in 1826 Pedrocchi turned to Jappelli, who was assisted by Bartolomeo Franceschini of Verona. It is a functional building on an irregular site in the shape of a harpsichord. At the south and north-east corners are little loggias in the Greek Revival style. The ground-floor premises were inaugurated on 9 June 1831, and the upper rooms were opened to the public on 16 September 1842. Each room on the upper floors, intended to house the Casino del Nobili, was decorated in a different style, partly to mask the irregularity of the trapezoidal plan. At the top of the main staircase was the Etruscan room, used as a changing-room; it was followed by the Greek room, octagonal in plan, with frescoes of Plato’s Academy by Giovanni De Min; the small rotunda, with frescoes by Ippolito Caffi on themes based on the Roman liking for ruins; the armoury; the Renaissance room, with a ceiling fresco by Vincenzo Gazzotto (1807–1884) of the Triumph of Civilization; and the Herculaneum room with eight frescoes of the Festivals of Diana by Pietro Paoletti. This led into the great ballroom dedicated to the composer Gioachino Rossini, decorated in the Empire style and incorporating the Napoleonic symbol of gilded bees. Moorish taste was evident in the cloakrooms, with contributions by Giovanni De Min, and Egyptian taste in the little room, the ceiling of which is covered with stars, clearly in homage to Giovanni Battista Piranesi and the Paduan explorer and archaeologist Giovanni Belzoni. Jappelli also attended to the design of the furnishings, including chairs, tables and lamps, as well as to the coffee-making machines. A theatrical addition to the café, the ‘Pedrocchino’, was later built (1837–9) in a Gothic Revival style, with the collaboration of Franceschini and decorative contributions by Antonio Gradenigo (1806–84). It was probably influenced by Jappelli’s visit to Britain in 1836–7, where he designed a funerary monument for Alexander Hamilton, 10th Duke of Hamilton, in Lanarkshire, Scotland.

=== Romantic gardens ===
Jappelli received many requests for consultations and opinions for the layout of parks in the English style in Padua and the rest of Italy, and he worked on these while also making numerous trips abroad. In 1827 he was working on the Villa Gera at Conegliano in the Veneto; in 1829 his first Paduan garden, for Baron Treves at the Domenico Cerato hospital complex, was still unfinished. From 1834 to 1835 he was engaged in a large-scale work of marshland reclamation at Castelguelfo, near Parma.

=== Later years ===
In 1835 he was in Paris and from 1836 to 1837 in England. During these years he also laid out parks for the Villa Torlonia (completed 1840 ) in Via Nomentana, Rome, of Prince Alessandro Torlonia, which included a Gothic Revival chapel; for Agostino Sopranzi at Tradate, near Varese; for the Trieste family at Vaccarino, near Padua; and for the counts of Hierschel at Precenicco, in Friuli. His last works in Padua, apart from a general consultation for the Pacchierotti garden, were the house and garden for his friend Giacomo Andrea Giacomini (1839) and the renovation of the Teatro Verdi (1846–7). In 1850, after working on the Teatro San Benedetto in Venice, he planned the general rearrangement of the buildings belonging to the Chamber of Commerce.

== Select works ==
=== Buildings ===
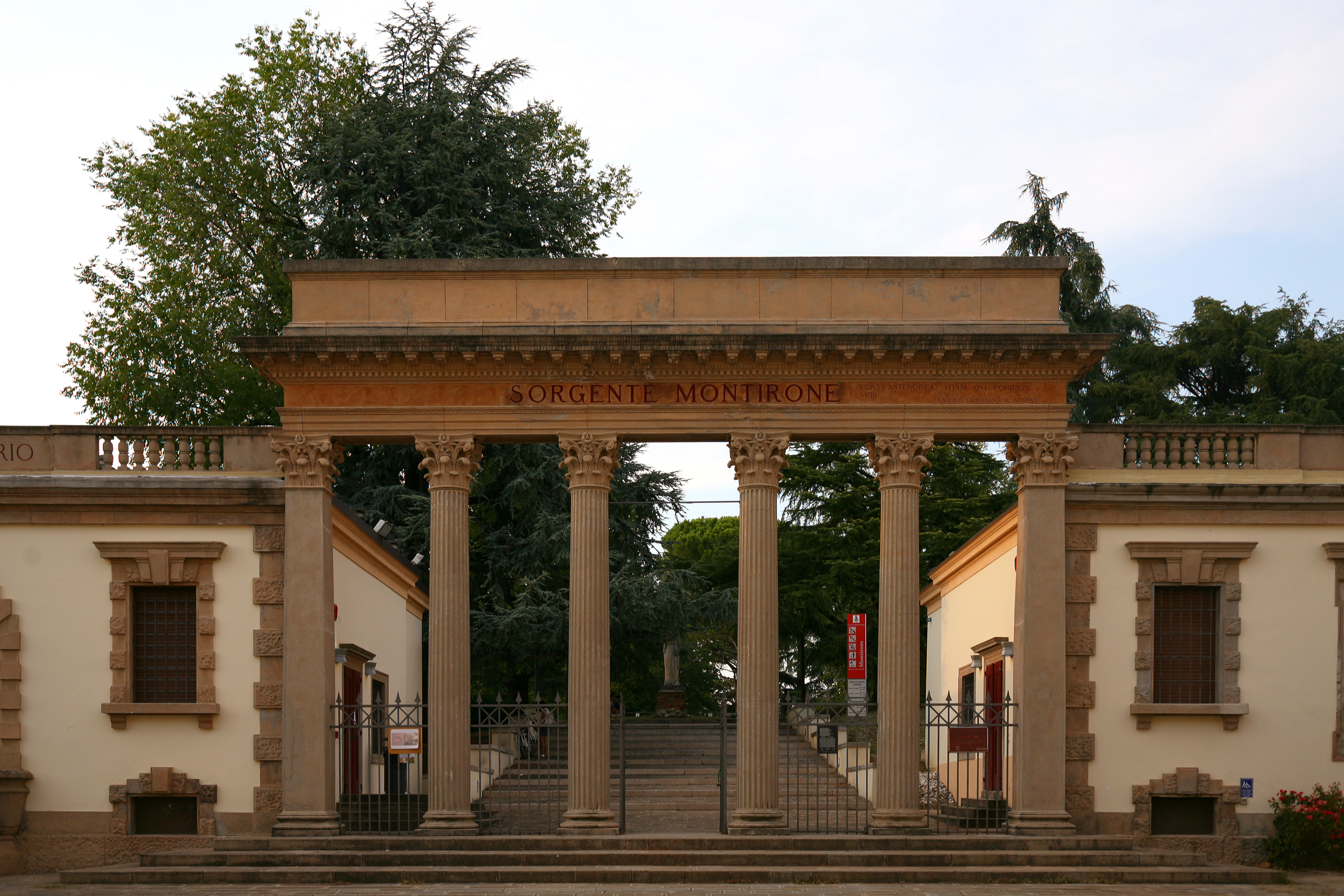
Thermal baths in Abano Terme

- Slaughter-house in Padua (1819–1824), now the Institute of Art
- The Loggia Amulea (1825)
- The University city of Padua (1824)
- The prison in Padua (1822)
- The Pedrocchi Café in Padua (1831)
- The Teatro Verdi in Padua (1847)

=== Parks ===
- Garden with thermal lakes of Castello Palazzo Reale Selvatico
- Garden of Sommi in Torre de' Picenardi (1814)
- Villa Vigodarzere in Saonara (1816)
- Villa Torlonia in Rome (1838–1840)
- Pedrocchino in Padua (1837–1842)
- Treves de' Bonfili Park (1829 - 1835), the first park designed in Padua
