= Pedrocchi Café =

Café in Padua, Italy

Coordinates: 45°24′28″N 11°52′38″E

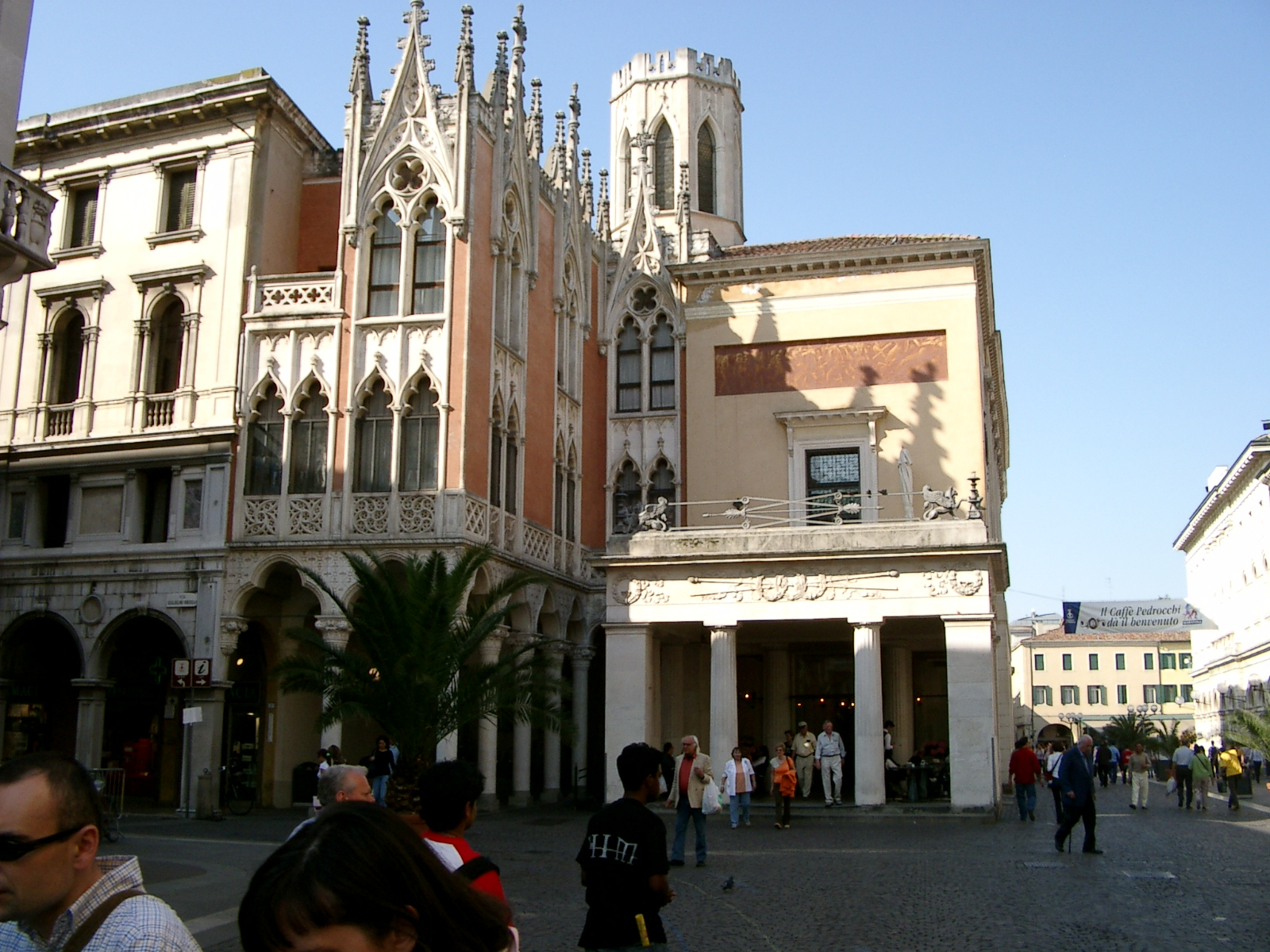
Caffé Pedrocchi.

The Pedrocchi Café (Caffè Pedrocchi in Italian) is a café founded in the 18th century in central Padua, Italy. It has architectural prominence because its rooms were decorated in diverse styles, arranged in an eclectic ensemble by the architect Giuseppe Jappelli. The café has historical prominence because of its role in the 1848 riots against the Habsburg monarchy, as well as for being an attraction for artists over the last century from the French novelist Stendhal to Lord Byron to the Italian writer Dario Fo.

== History ==
Between the 18th and 19th centuries, coffee consumption by the expanding bourgeoisie of Europe at public establishments expanded. In 1772 the Francesco Pedrocchi of Bergamo founded a successful "coffee shop" here, near the University, town hall, markets, post office and the square of the Noli (now Piazza Garibaldi), from where coaches left to nearby cities. The new café was to be "the most beautiful one on the Earth", it opened in 1831 and then joined, in 1836, from Pedrocchino, elegant neo-Gothic building reserved for the pastry.

His son Antonio expanded the premises to cover the entire block. In 1826 Antonio Pedrocchi presents to the municipal authorities a project for the construction of a plant, including premises used for roasting coffee, and ice-making. He also asked Giuseppe Jappelli, engineer and architect already to redesign the premises. Jappelli had to integrate different buildings and facades into a single unit, creating an eclectic exterior of diverse facade. The interior has neoclassical elements. The coffee house from the early years became known as "coffee without doors" because until 1916 it was open day and night. This dictated an independent structure with an open porch and no windows, making a "transition" into or from the city. The prices were not expensive, as the city was already luxurious for its time, thus you could eat regardless of how much money you had. The owner, Antonio Pedrocchi was among the first to install gas lights. He had a very peculiar way of treating customers: anyone could sit at tables without ordering and stay to read books and newspapers. Women were given gifts and flowers, in the case of sudden rain, customers were lent an umbrella.

"The Pedrocchi Cafe" became the first of six newspapers, which were named after the coffee house.

The ground floor was completed in 1831, while in 1839, the Gothic pastry shop called "Pedrocchino" was built. During the "Fourth Congress of Italian Scientists" in 1842, the rooms of the upper floor were inaugurated. Japelli collaborated with the engineer Bartolommeo Franceschini and the architect Giuseppe Petrelli, to whom we owe the merger of the balustrades of the terraces with the griffins. The painter Giovanni De Min, helped decorate the Greek room; Ippolito Caffi, the Roman room; Pietro Paoletti, the Pompeian room (or "Ercolana"); Vincenzo Gazzotto, painted the ceiling in the Renaissance Room.

Antonio Pedrocchi died on January 22, 1852, and left the enterprise to the son of an apprentice, Domenico Cappellato. On the death of Cappellato in 1891, the cafe was willed to the city of Padua. Cappellato spelled out that:

It is the solemn obligation and enduring to the city of Padua to preserve in perpetuity over the property, the use of the plant as is found today, seeking to promote and develop all those improvements that will be brought by the progress of time putting

— From testament Domenico Bruno Cappellato Pedrocchi

== Forfeiture ==
An inevitable deterioration was caused by the difficulties caused by the Great War between 1915 and 1924. The restoration of "Pedrocchino" began afterwards and continued until 1927. In the following years it lost much of the original furniture designed by the Jappelli, which was replaced gradually during the fascist era.

After World War II, with the project architect Angelo Pisani that is imposed against that of Carlo Scarpa, never considered by the municipality, started a new restoration that redefined the rooms overlooking the back alley, transformed the alley in a gallery covered with glass block and gets a few shops, a public telephone and a bronze fountain gutting part Offelleria, the restaurateur and demolishing the Billiard.

== Architecture ==
The Pedrocchi Café is set up a triangular building, like a harpsichord. The main facade has a base of smooth ashlar. Towards the east, along the Via VIII of February are the three main rooms on the ground floor: the White Room, the Red Room and the Green Room, named after the color of tapestries made after the unification of Italy in 1861.

Caffè Pedrocchi, one of the leading European Cafes and one survivor from the ancient Italian Café tradisoin. It is in the central square, including Palazzo Moroni, the Town Hall, and Bo, home of the University. During the excavation of the foundations they found old columns, now the town museum, and several marbles were used for making coffee.

Its architecture, which blends the neoclassical style in the Venetian Gothic, with references exotic Egyptian and chinoiserie to reflect the romantic atmosphere of the time and the inspiration of the architect Jappelli.

=== Ground Floor ===
The north facade of the Café is characterized by two arcades with Doric columns. There are four lions carved by the Roman sculptor Giuseppe Petrelli. In the square in front of the Cafe, Jappelli, had designed a fountain with a statue of Hebe by Canova, but the project was never realized. A staircase leads to the right loggia on the top floor, or Piano Nobile. The ground floor is characterized by a succession of rooms named according to the color of the upholstery (White Room, Red Room, Yellow Room, Green Room).

Entering the Cafe, to the left we find the Green Room and the Yellow Room, so called because you met traders here to fix prices of certain goods. Immediately after the Green Room is the large red room, divided by three by Ionic columns with Egyptian bases and a bench decorated with bronze decorations. Beyond the Red Room is the White Room, which opens onto Via VIII of February and the University.

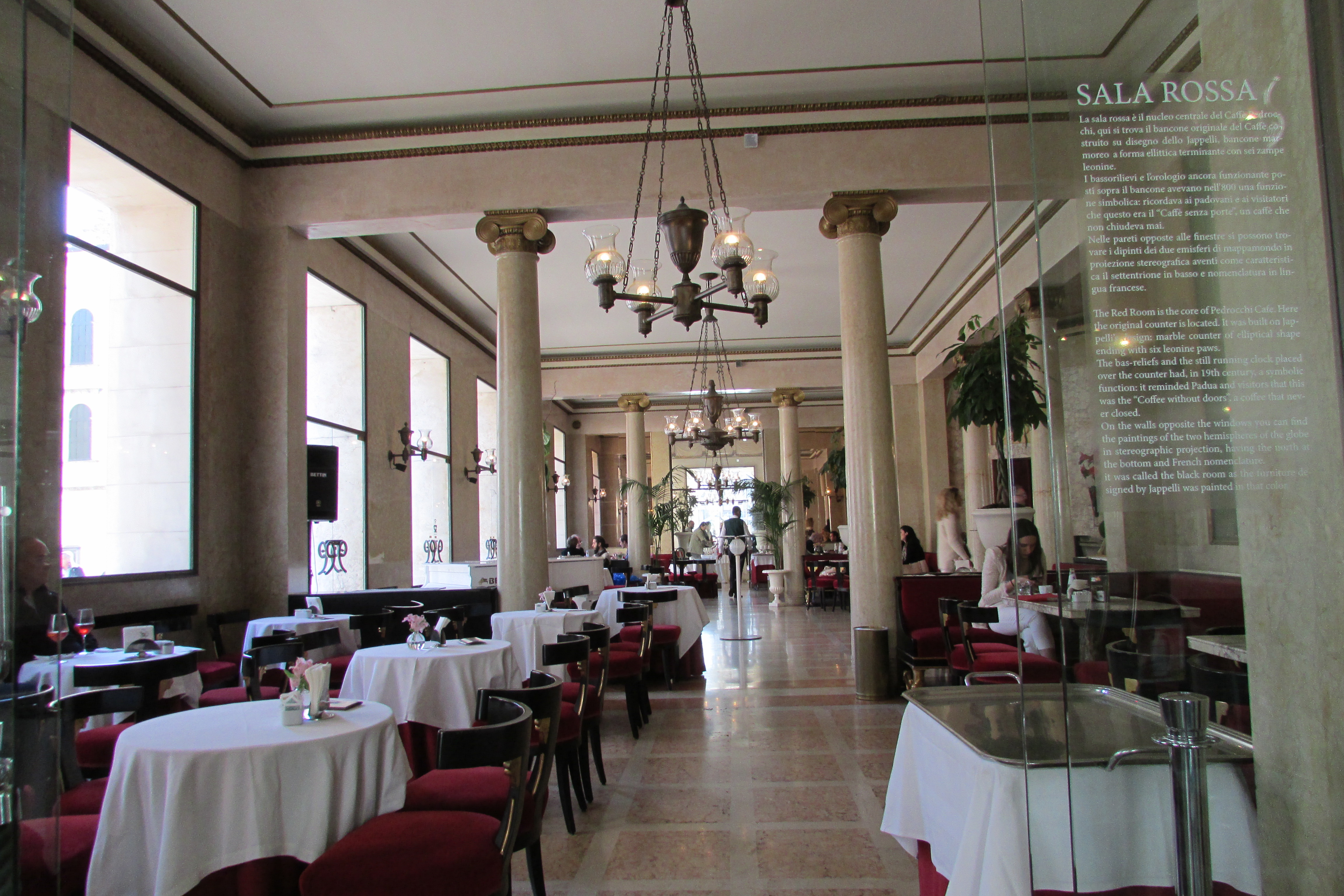
Red Room

Red Room: The Red Room is the central one, divided into three spaces, it is the largest. The Red Room is the core of Pedrocchi Café. Here the original counter is located. It was built on Jappelli’s design: marble counter of elliptical shape ending with six leonine paws. Both the bas-reliefs and the clock over the counter had in 19th century, a symbolic function, it reminded Padua and visitor that this was the “Coffee without doors”, a café that never closed. The walls opposite the windows you can find the paintings of the two hemispheres of the globe in stereographic projection, with the north at the bottom and using French nomenclature. It was first called the black room as the furniture designed by Jappelli was painted black.

Green Room: The Green Room is similar in size and decoration to the parallel white room, except for the color of the tapestry that is green, and has a mirror over the fireplace. The social function of the room is for the poorest people of the city, or students from the nearby university to meet. Students knew that in this room they could stay undisturbed for warmth during the winter, to make conversation or to study without a waiter disturbing them. Hence the Italian expression “essere al verde” (literally - "to be green"), signifies "to be penniless", or "to be broke".

White Room: The White Room, faces the Bo, kept in a wall hole of a bullet fired in 1848 by Austro-Hungarian soldiers against students in revolt against Habsburg rule. In addition, it is also known as the setting chosen by Stendhal for his novel "The Charterhouse of Parma".

Exchange or Octagonal Hall: Completes the ground floor of the Stock Exchange or the Octagonal Hall. Its original purpose was for trading business. It is one of the most changed spaces from the 1950 restoration project. In the course of time it has returned to its original size. Intended for a commercial use as a space for the sale and trading agricultural products, grain in particular. Over time, the hall and the surrounding areas have hosted the smoking room and billiards. These items were deleted by Pisani renovation in 1950, that wanted to create a concert hall space and a work area for the Café.

To the south coffee ending with a loggia supported by Doric columns and flanked by the body of the so-called neo-Gothic "Pedrocchino". The latter, is constituted by a turret with an octagonal base which represents a source of light, thanks to the windows on each side. Also, inside there is a spiral staircase. Two lodges in the same style are located on the north side, and in front of these there are four stone lions carved from Petrelli, which mimic those of basalt that adorn the cordoned del Campidoglio in Rome.

Exterior: On the south end is a loggia supported by Doric columns and flanked by the body of the neo-Gothic "Pedrocchino". The latter, is constituted by a turret with an octagonal base, which represents a source of light, from the windows on each side. Inside there is a spiral staircase. Two loggias in the same style are located on the north side, and in front of these there are four stone lions carved by Petrelli, which mimic those of basalt that adorn the Cordonata di Campidoglio in Rome. Between the two lodges on the north side there is a terrace bordered by Corinthian columns.

=== Noble Floor ===
The upper floor includes a number of functional spaces decorated with historical styles of the past. Each room connects through a series, the Sala Etruscan, a Greek Hall in octagonal shape, to the Saletta, round or Roman, then the Renaissance Hall, to the Hall Ercolana or Pompeian, followed by the Egyptian Hall and then the Hall Napoleon, dedicated to Gioacchino Rossini. The Hall Napoleon is also called Hall Rossini, a theater where stucco, curtains, chandeliers are from earlier in the nineteenth century. Previously each room had a specific purpose. The Etruscan, Greek halls were used for games. The Rossini Hall served as a ballroom, while the Egyptian Hall held numerous secret meetings. Decoratations were subject to the style of rooms name.

Between the two lodges on the north side there is a terrace bordered by Corinthian columns. The upper floor or " piano nobile " is divided into ten rooms, each decorated in a different style :

1. Etruscan
2. Greek
3. Roman: characterized by a circular;
4. Stanzino Baroque
5. Renaissance
6. Gothic: medieval
7. Ercolana or Pompeian: typical decorations are reminiscent of Roman villas;
8. Rossini is the biggest room; it reproduces the same plan of the Red Hall of the ground floor. In this room, dedicated to Rossini and Napoleon, we can see the stucco themed musical that symbolically represent the intended use;
9. Moorish: very small;
10. Egyptian: the four corners of the room are the plinths supporting a fake entablature, and other attributes that remind us of the Egyptian culture;

The Egyptian symbols were used before the finding of the Rosetta Stone by Champollion and a tribute to the Paduan explorer Giovanni Battista Belzoni, who discovered numerous Egyptian monuments. He was a friend of Jappelli providing information that could be used in the decorative motif;

At the first floor of the building is the Museum of the Risorgimento and the contemporary era. The museum includes many portraits, including Antonio Pedrocchi and his successor Dominic Cappellato Pedrocchi, both by Achille Astolfi.

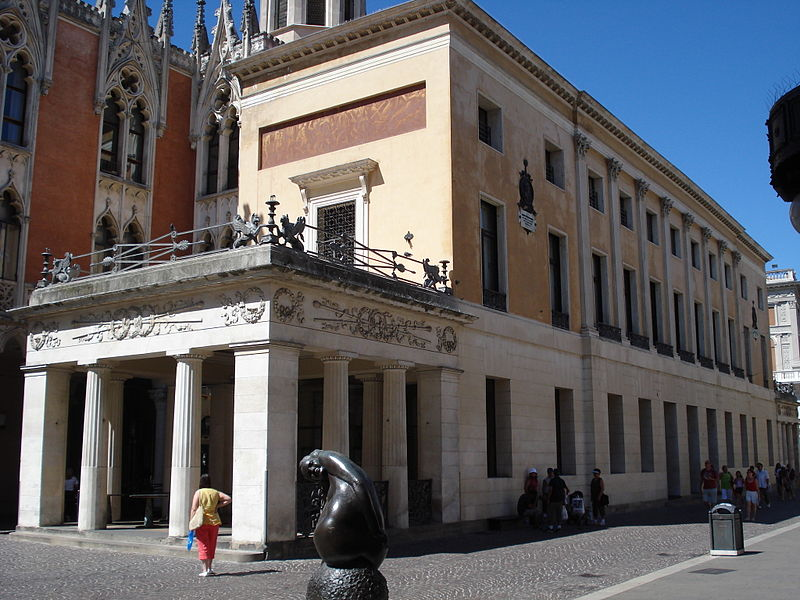
South loggia and the east facade

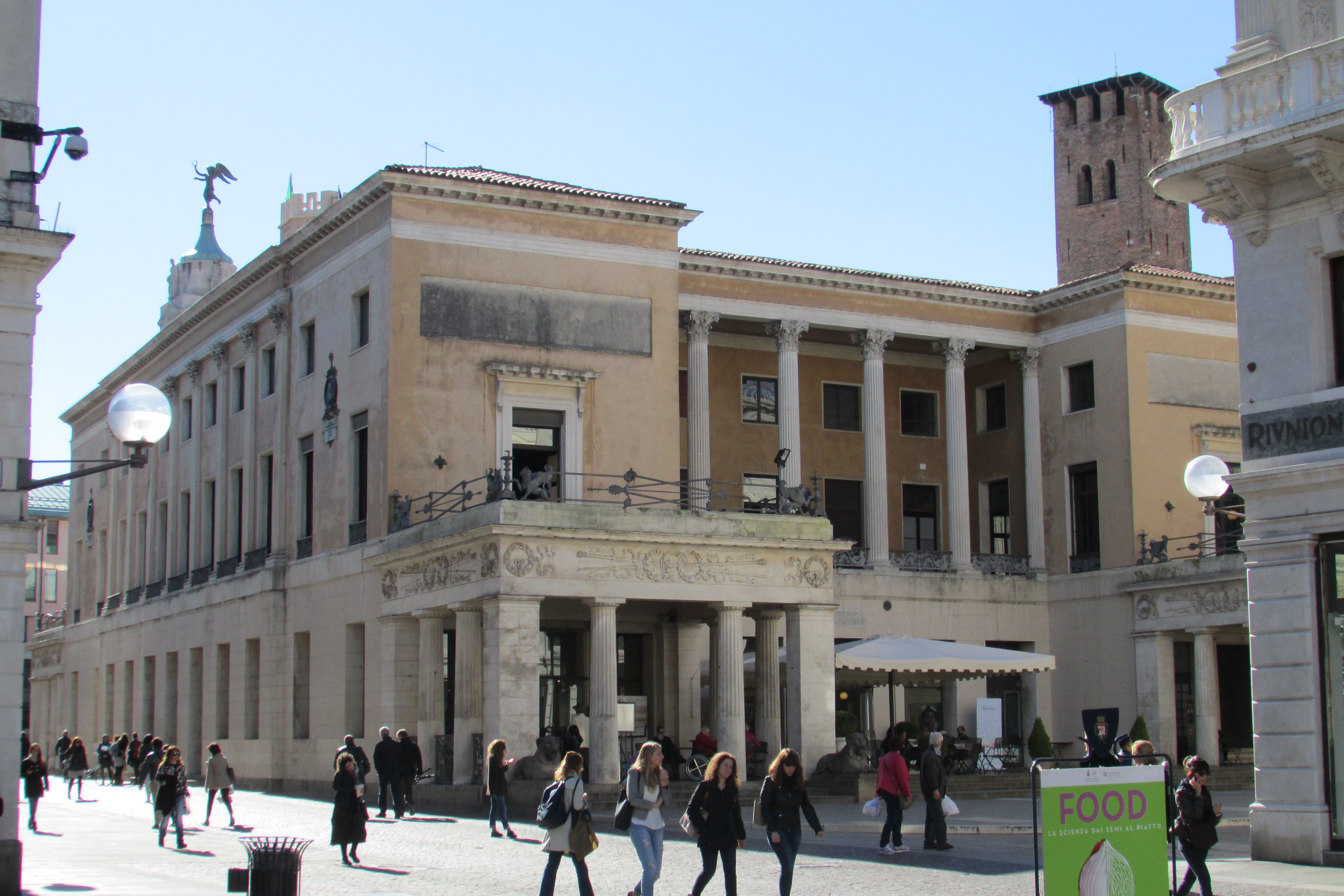
North loggias and piazza

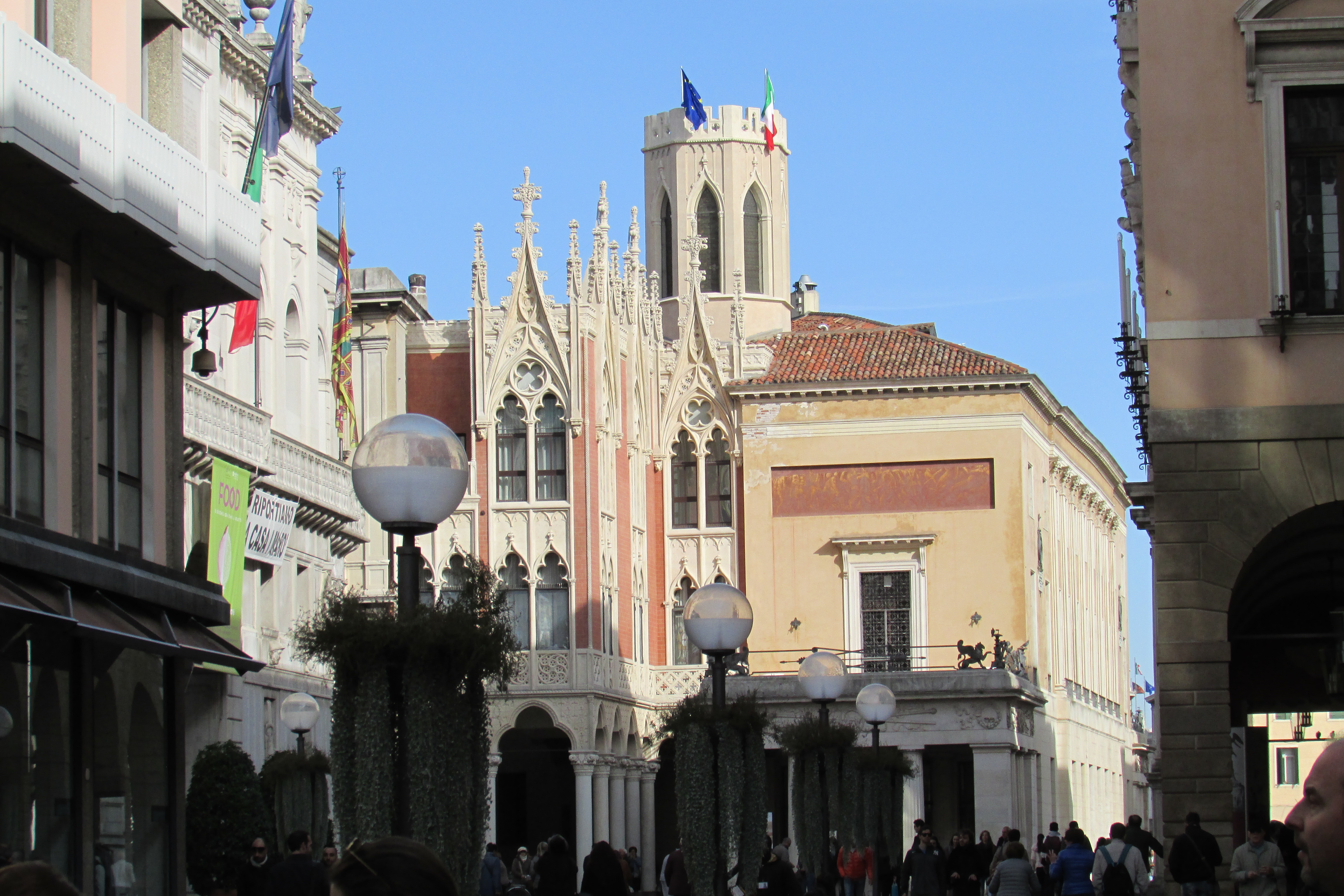
South facade of Caffè Pedrocchi

== The Tradition ==
Because of its central location and proximity to the seat of government the café soon became the cultural and commercial center and meeting place for students, artists, writers and patriots. It was also the scene of the 1848 student uprisings against the dominant Austrian, as evidenced by the souvenir plates on the wall of white room, and meeting place for writers and artists such Nievo, Fusinato, Stendhal, which even extolled the wonders of eggnog pedrocchiano, D'Annunzio, Eleonora Duse and the futurist Marinetti. Owned by the City of Padua since 1891, the coffee houses, along with the Galleries of Pedrocchi and the Museum of the Risorgimento, the public can still read one of the newspapers available in the Green Hall, have a meal or pastry and coffee, and discuss politics, culture and life.

== Café Pedrocchi today ==
The Fede Group, a leading company in food and beverages, has managed Caffè Pedrocchi since January 2014; the idea is to contribute to the City Council of Padua for the renovation project of the building, respecting the original structure and its historicity. The renovation will cover bathrooms and cellars, going through warehouses and electrical and air conditioning systems, up to the delicate restoration of fine stucco and frescoes and the renovation of antique sofas and chairs. New services and new initiatives, such as the birth of the modern area of Pastelaria Nova, the special of the Pedrocchi Experience, Aperitifs, Exclusive Events and the countless cultural and musical events.

== See also ==
- Neoclassical Architecture
- Gothic Revival architecture

== Bibliography ==
- Benevolo L., Storia dell'Architettura moderna, Bari, Laterza, 1979
- Francesca Montuori, Padova, Le grandi città d'arte, Electa/Il Sole 24 ore, 2007
- Hitchcock H. R., Architettura dell'800 e del'900, Torino, Einaudi, 1971
- Mazza B., (a cura di), Il Caffè Pedrocchi in Padova, Padova, 1984
- Mazza B., Puppi L., Guida storica al Caffè Pedrocchi di Padova, Padova, 1984
- Mazzi G., (a cura di), Atti del Convegno internazionale di studi su Giuseppe Jappelli e il suo tempo, Padova, 1982
- Middleton R., Watkin D., Architettura dell'800, Milano, Electa, 1977
- Paolo Possamai, Puppi L. (a cura di), Il Caffè Pedrocchi. La storia, le storie, Padova, 1999
- Paolo Possamai, Caffè Pedrocchi - Guida, Milano, Skira, 2000
- Paolo Possamai, Caffè Pedrocchi, Guide, Skira Editore, 2000
- Puppi L., Universo M., Le città nella storia d'Italia. Padova Bari, Laterza, 1982
- Puppi L., Il Caffè Pedrocchi di Padova, Vicenza, 1980
- Zevi B., Controstoria dell'architettura in Italia. Ottocento Novecento, Roma, Newton & Compton, 1996
