= Pietro Paoletti =

Italian painter (1801–1847)

Pietro Paoletti (1801 in Belluno – October 23, 1847 in Belluno) was an Italian painter and engraver.

== Biography ==
He took fresco training with Giovanni De Min. In 1827, he traveled to Rome on the recommendation of Count Leopoldo Cicognara, and there found patronage with Cardinal Placido Zurla in the court of Pope Gregory XVI. In Rome, he worked under the Neoclassic painter Camuccini.

His skill as a fresco artist, put him in demand across the peninsula. Among his works are frescoes for the Basilica in the Abbey of Monte Cassino, the church of Santa Maria Formosa in Venice, and for many of the Torlonia properties in Rome including Palazzo Torloni in Piazza Venezia and Villa Torlonia in Rome (the latter had stories from Aesop's fables as well a portraits of artists seen below). He also frescoed the apse and the cupola of the Cathedral of Rieti with stories from the bible. He also painted for or his works are found in Villa de Manzoni near Agordo, Palazzo Ricci in Rieti, Palazzo Lucernari and del Governatore in Rome, Church of San Isidoro, Rome, Casa dell’Intendente in L'Aquila, San Francesco, Naples, Chapel of Pius V and in the Loggia of the Vatican, the famous Caffè Pedrocchi and Palazzo Cittadella-Vigodarzere in Padua, Villa Patt in Sedico, Palazzo Bortolan and Palazzo Spineda in Treviso, Palazzo Vecchia in Vicenza.

He also is known to have made plaster cast cameos or Intaglios. This was a peculiar art form from the early, pre-photographic, 19th century: small reliefs were sculpted to depict either parts or all of major works. The impressions of these reliefs were then pressed on to oval or round plaster medallions. These mementoes were then bound into volumes. They were mementoes of prominent works in Rome. For example, one set by Paoletti had works from the Capitoline, (Rome), Uffizi, the Louvre, Capodimonte, and Vatican museums; as well as works from Villa Albani and by Canova, and Thorvaldsen. His brother Giuseppe Paoletti was a vedute painter.

== Frescoes in Villa Torlonia ==
Portraits of Italian Artists

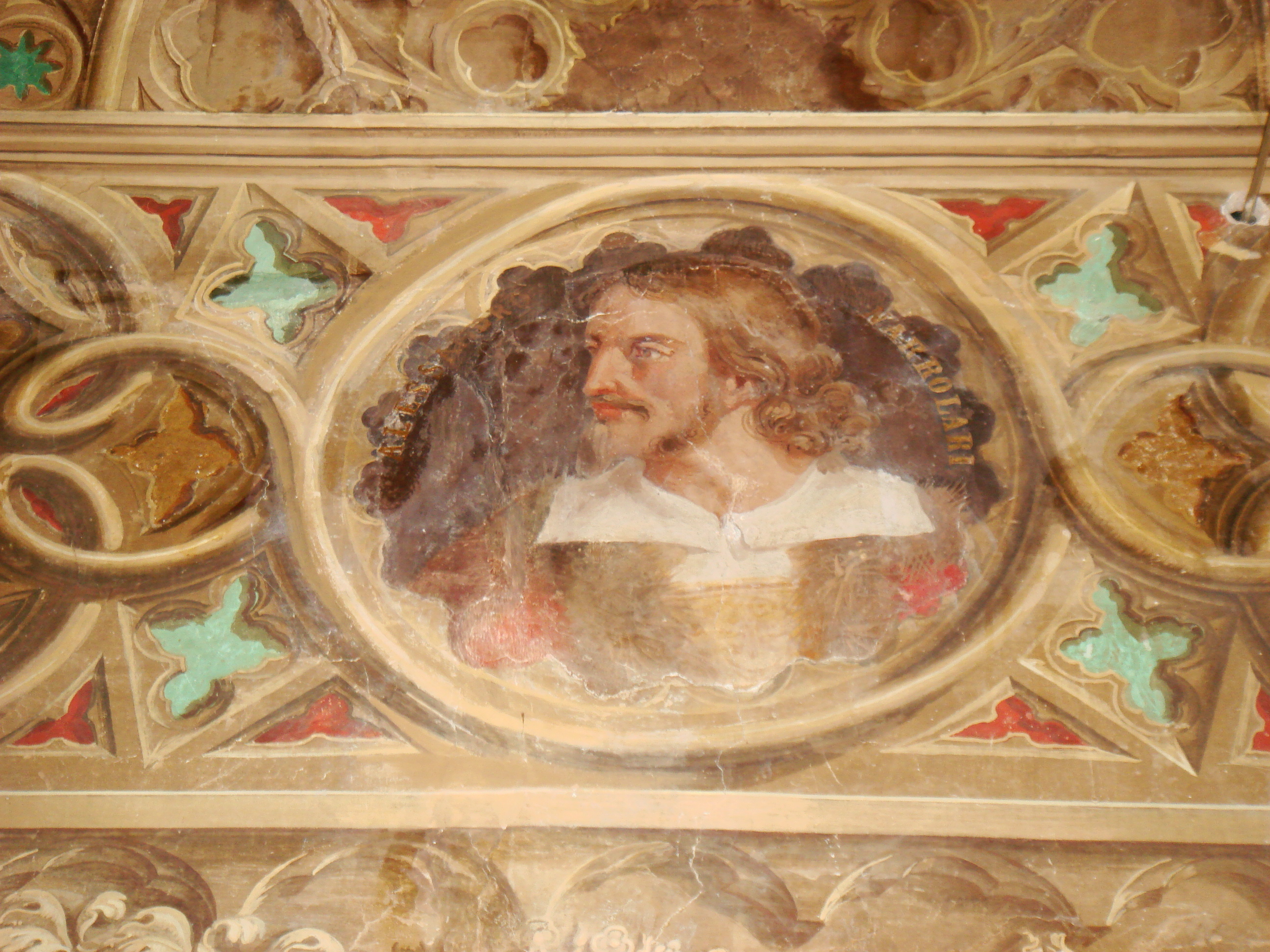
Alessandro Varrotari

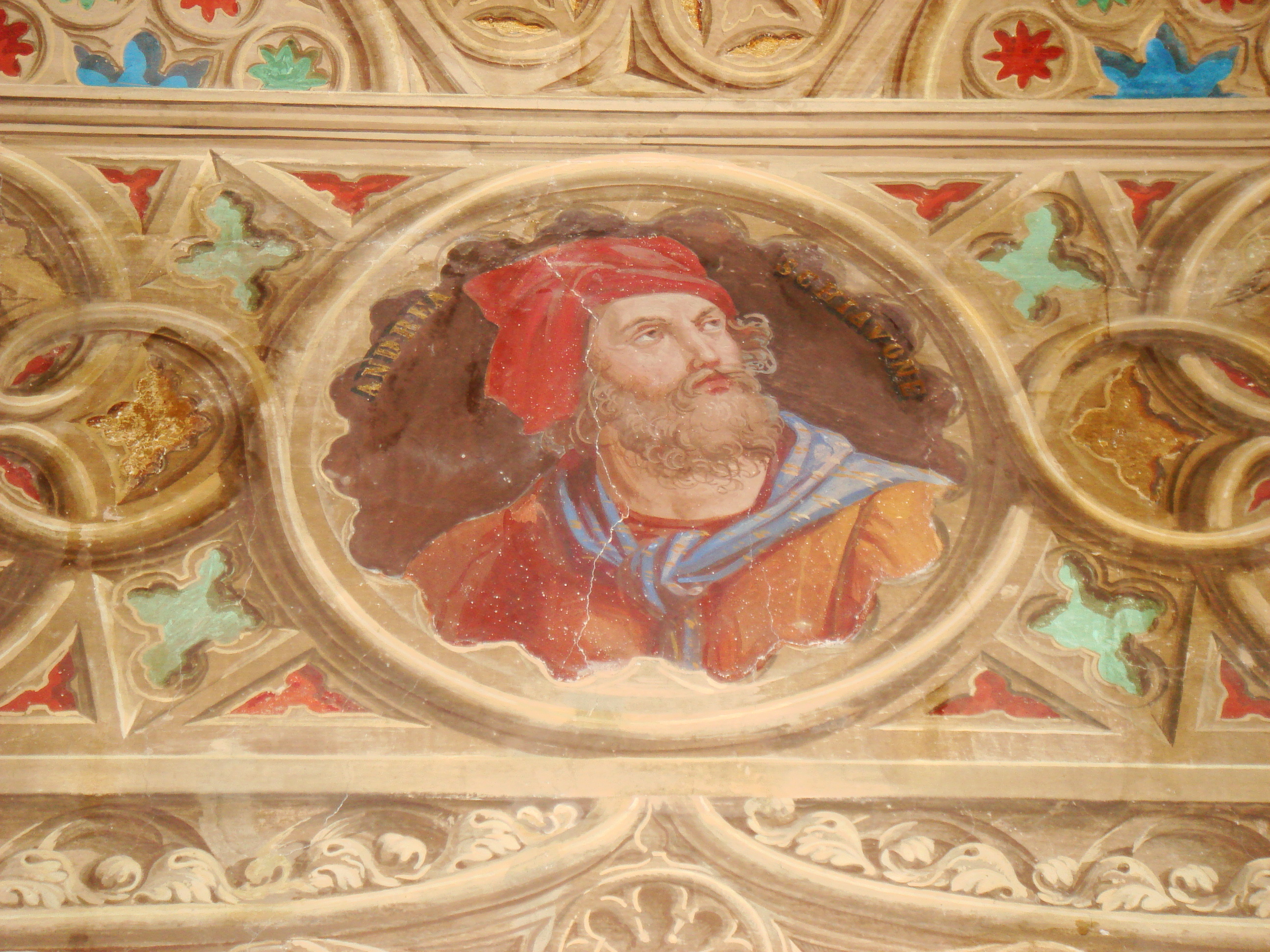
A. Schiavone

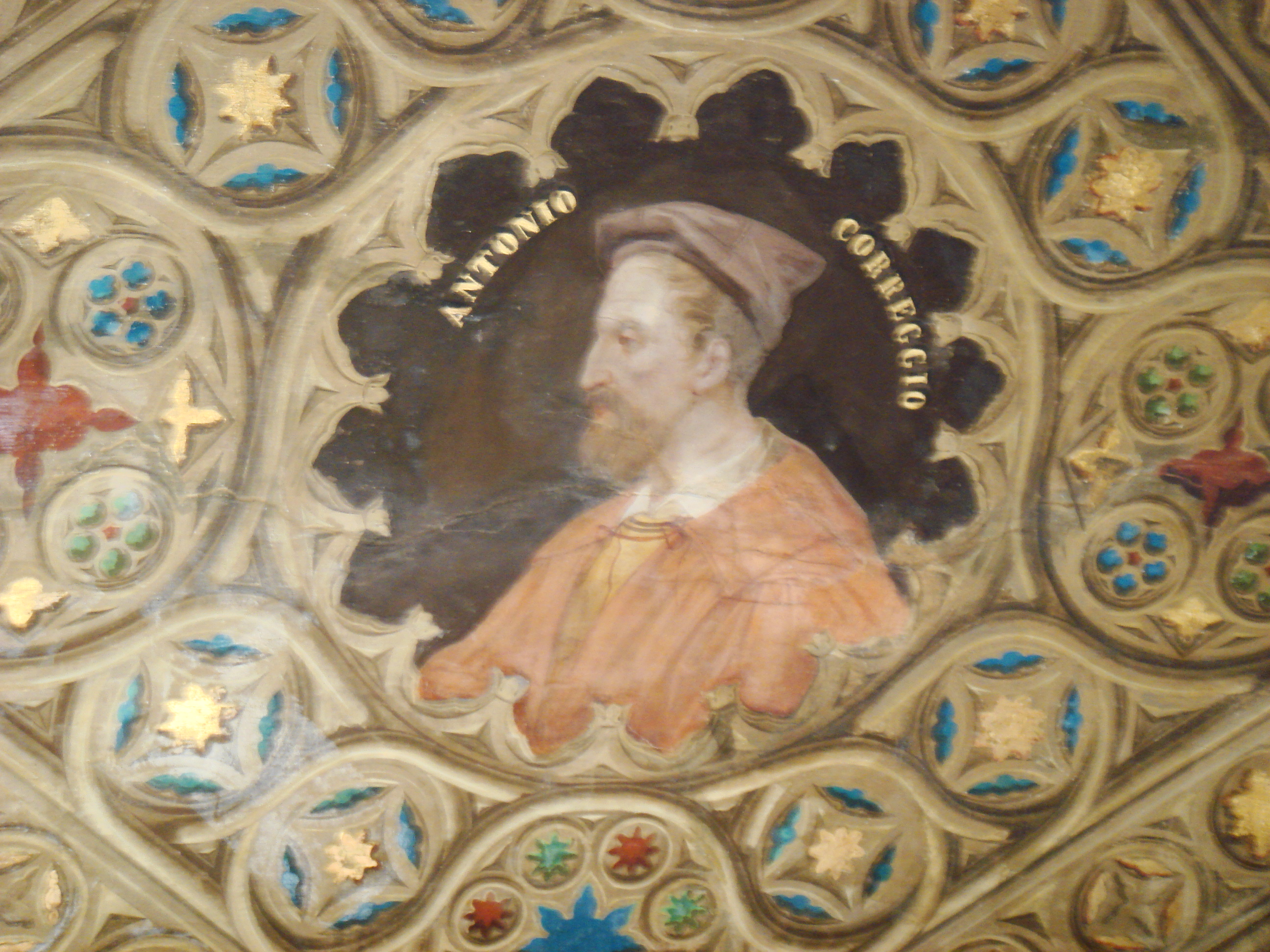
Correggio

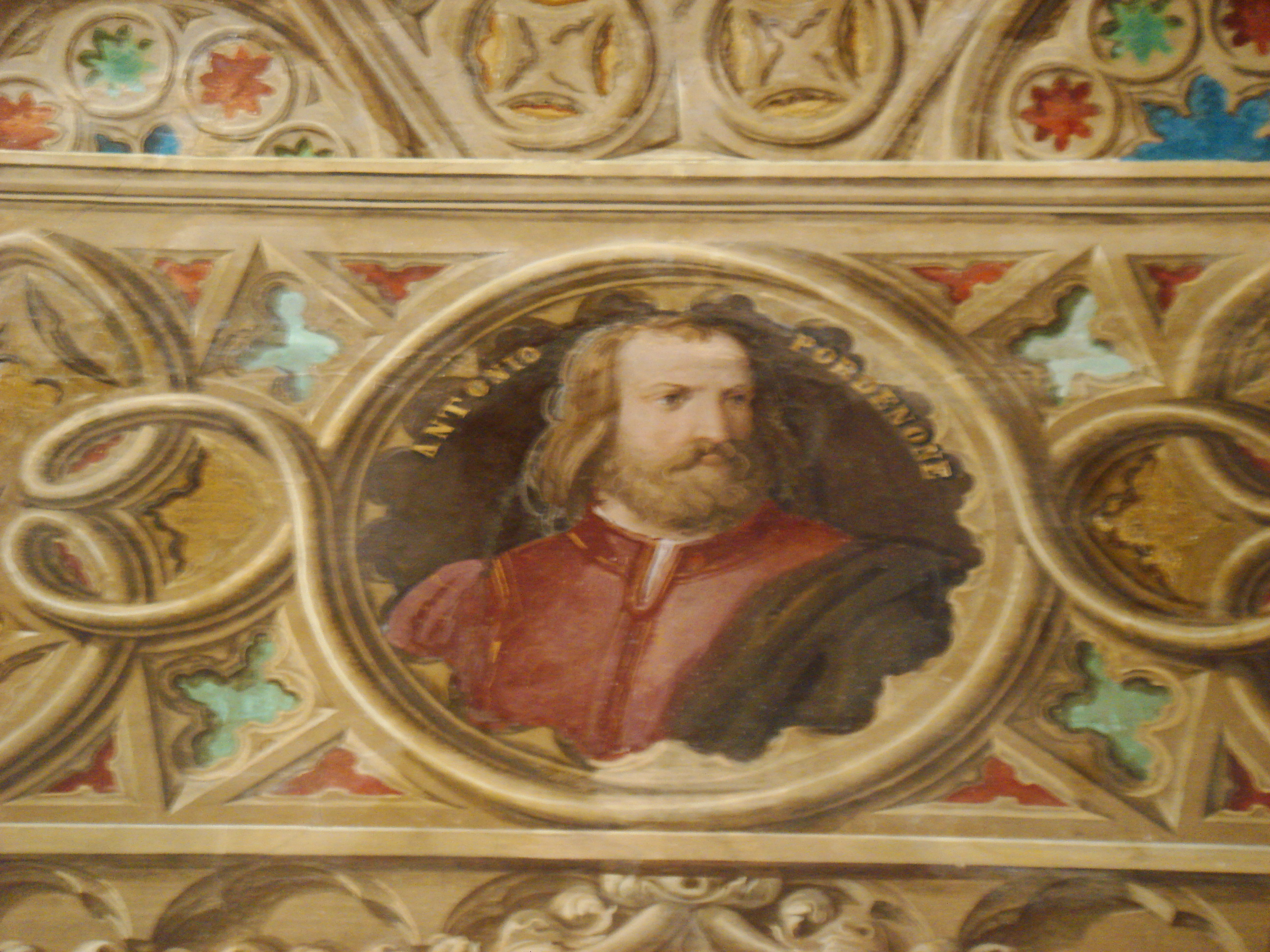
Pordenone

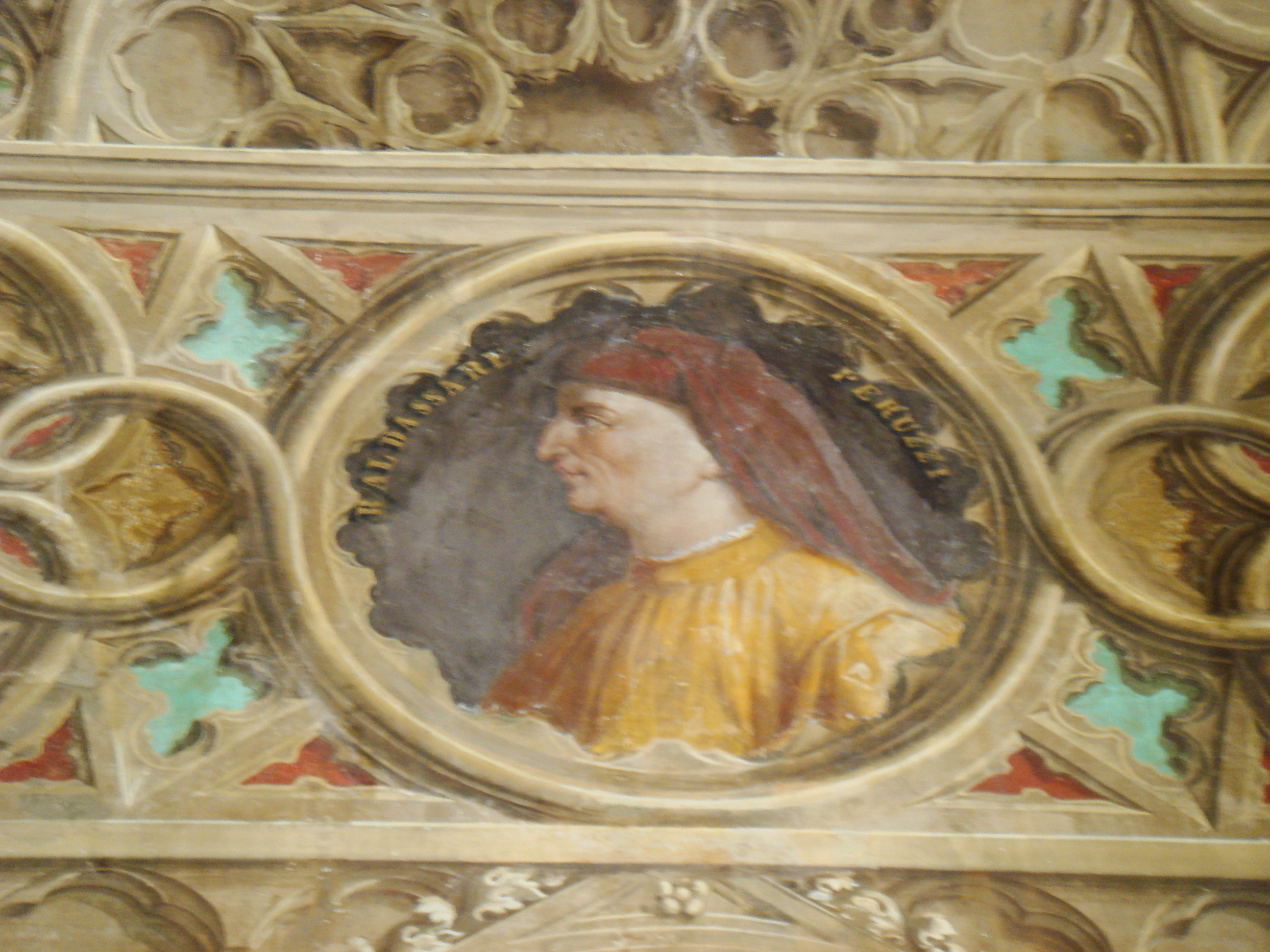
Peruzzi

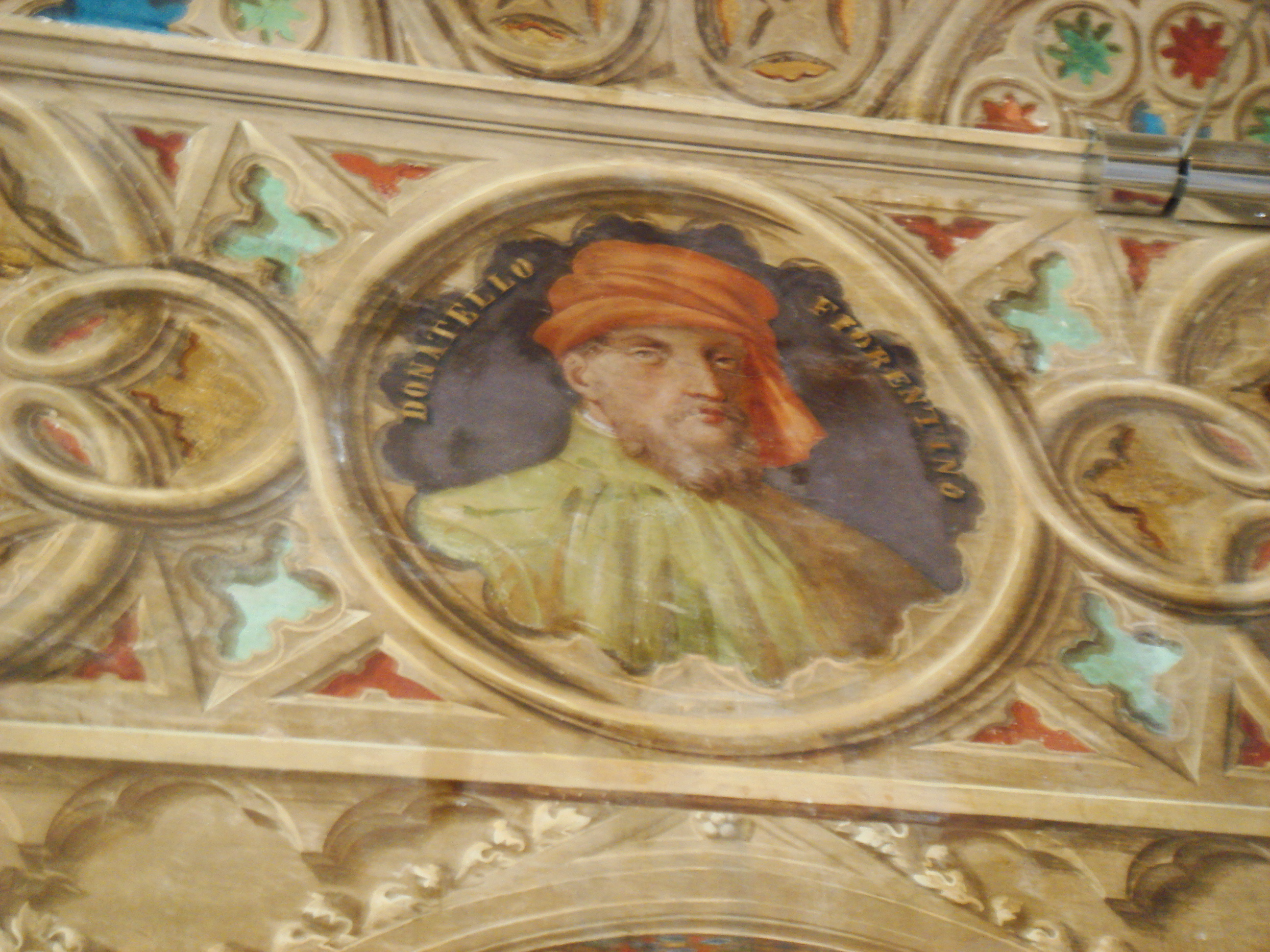
Donatello

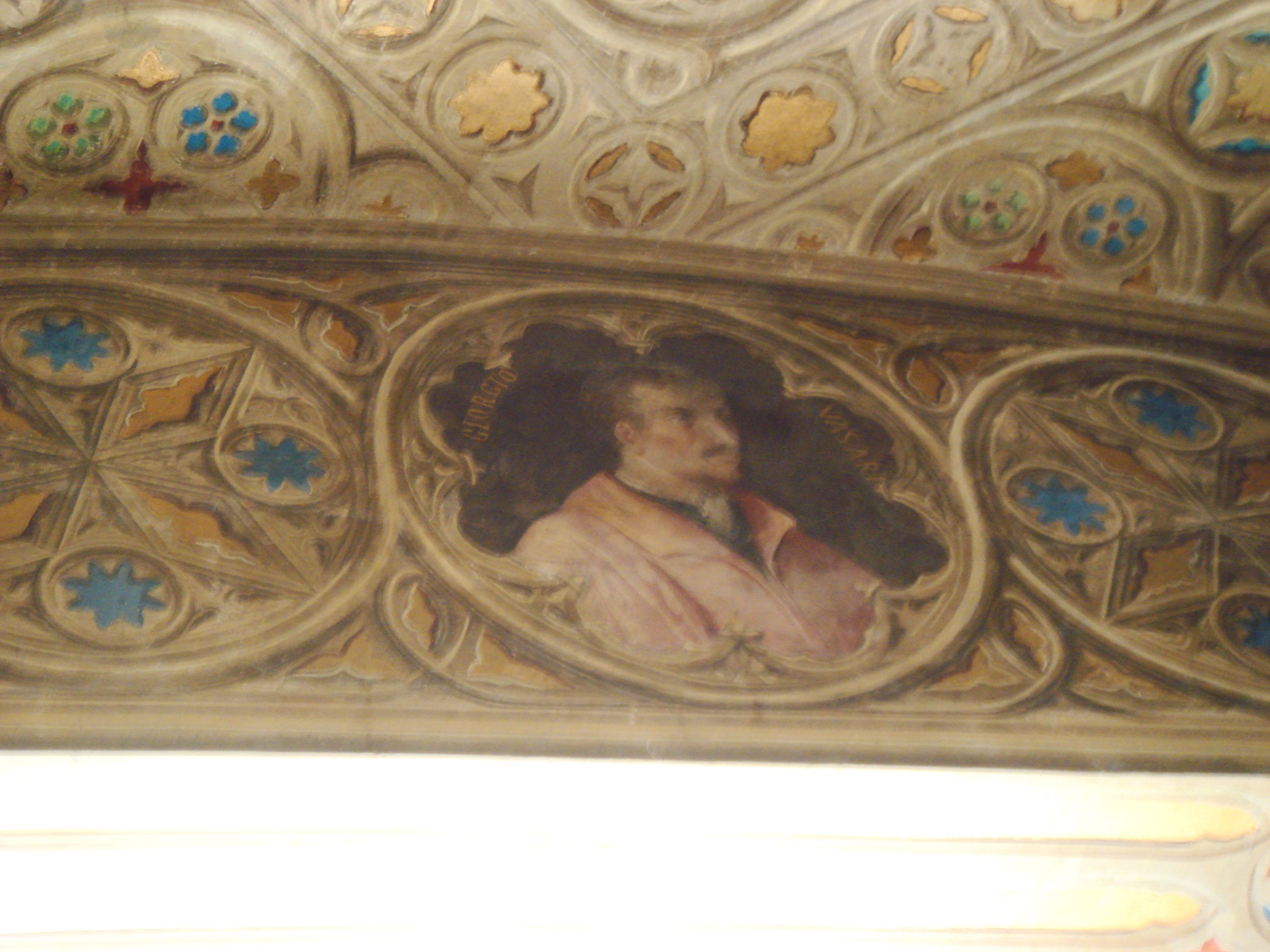
Vasari

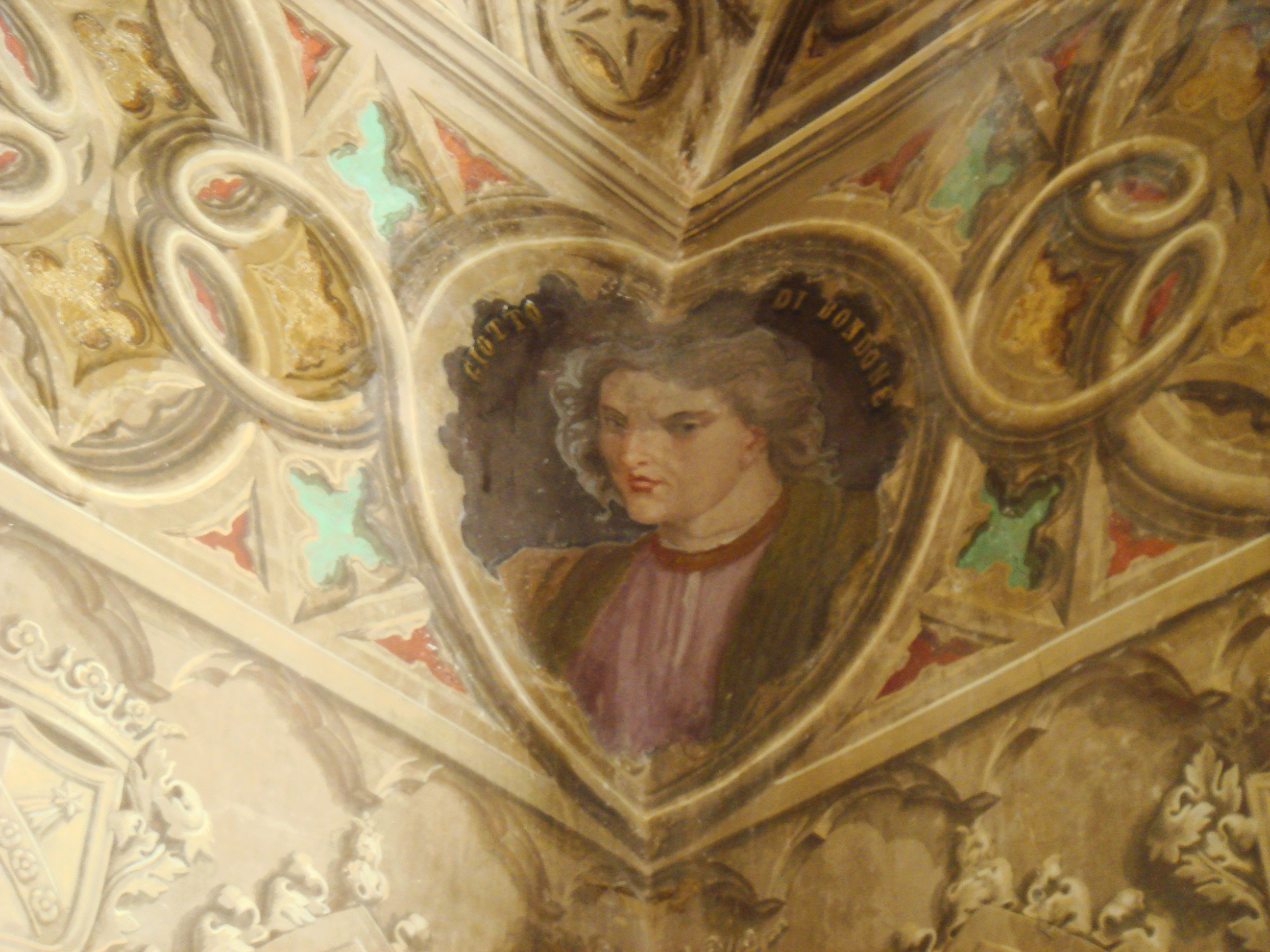
Giotto

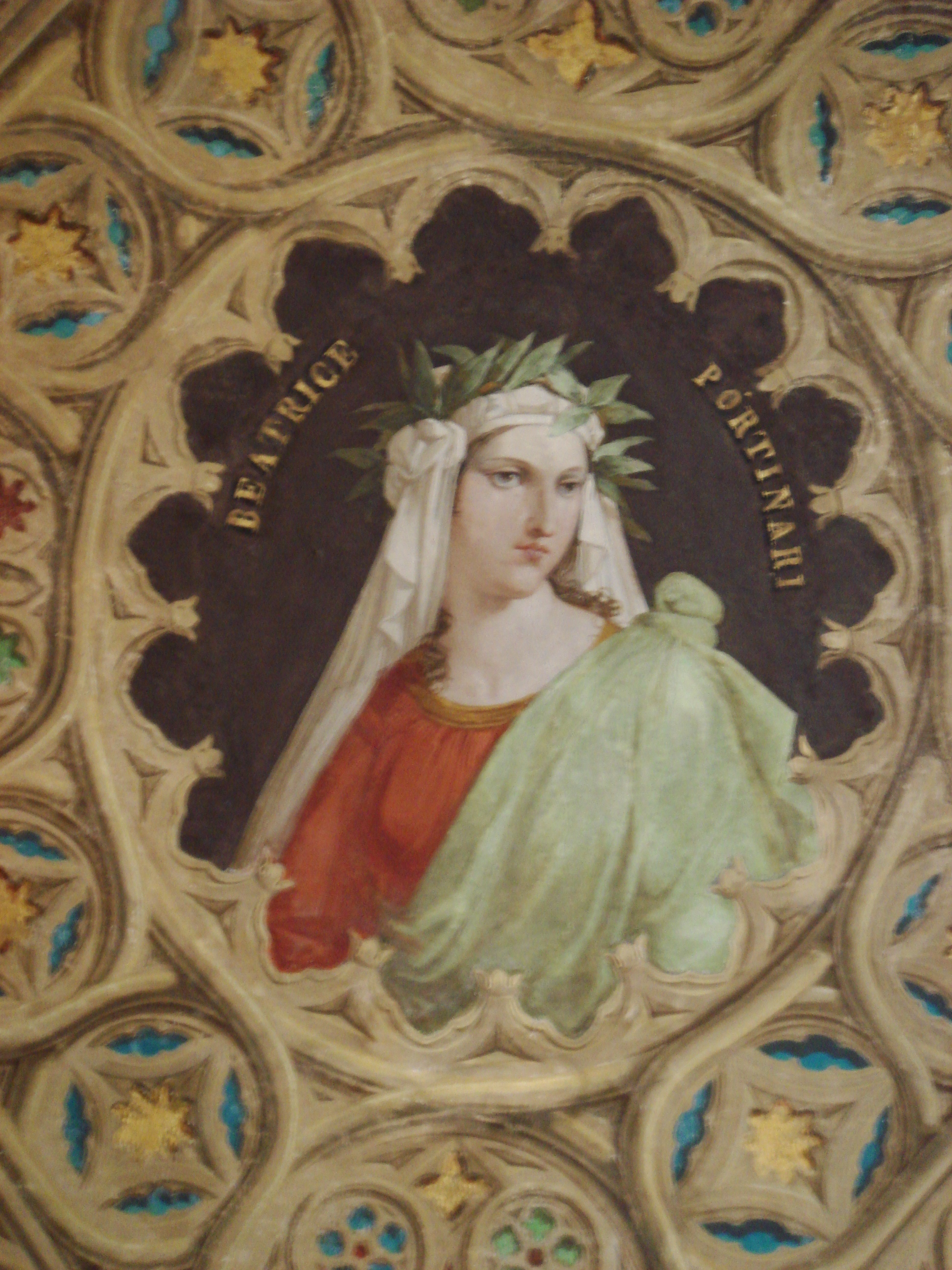
Beatrice Portinari

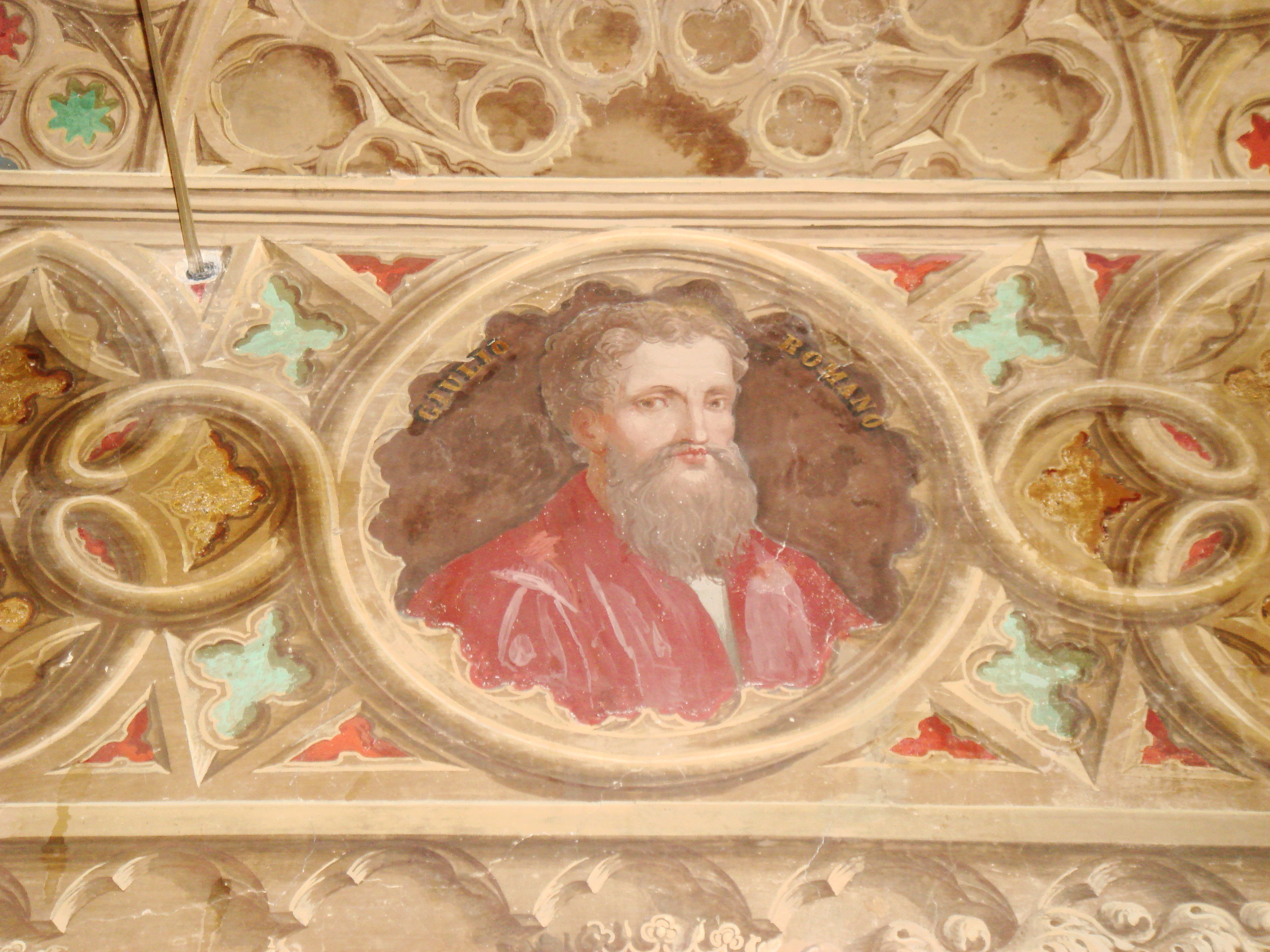
Giulio Romano

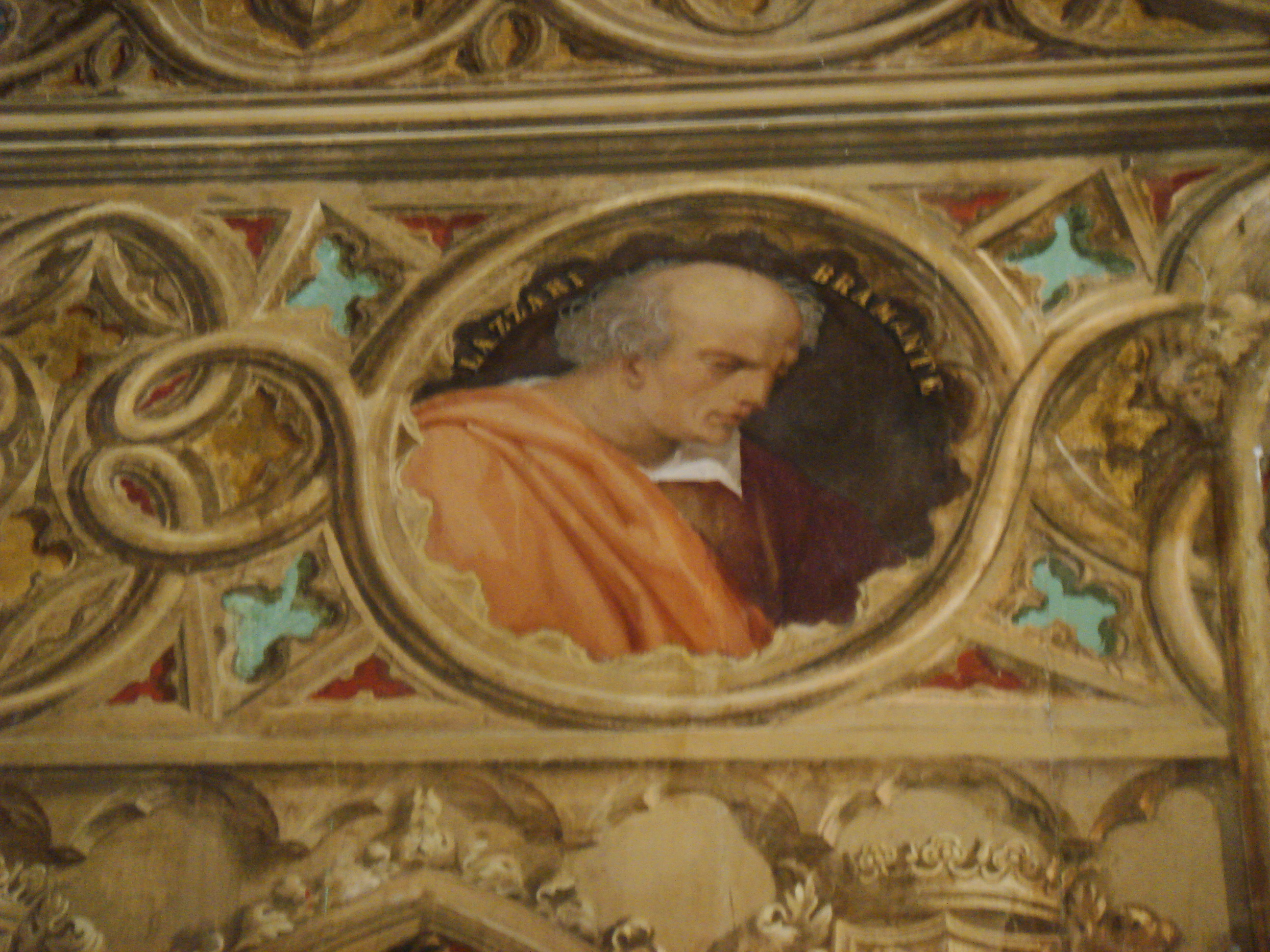
Lazzari Bramante

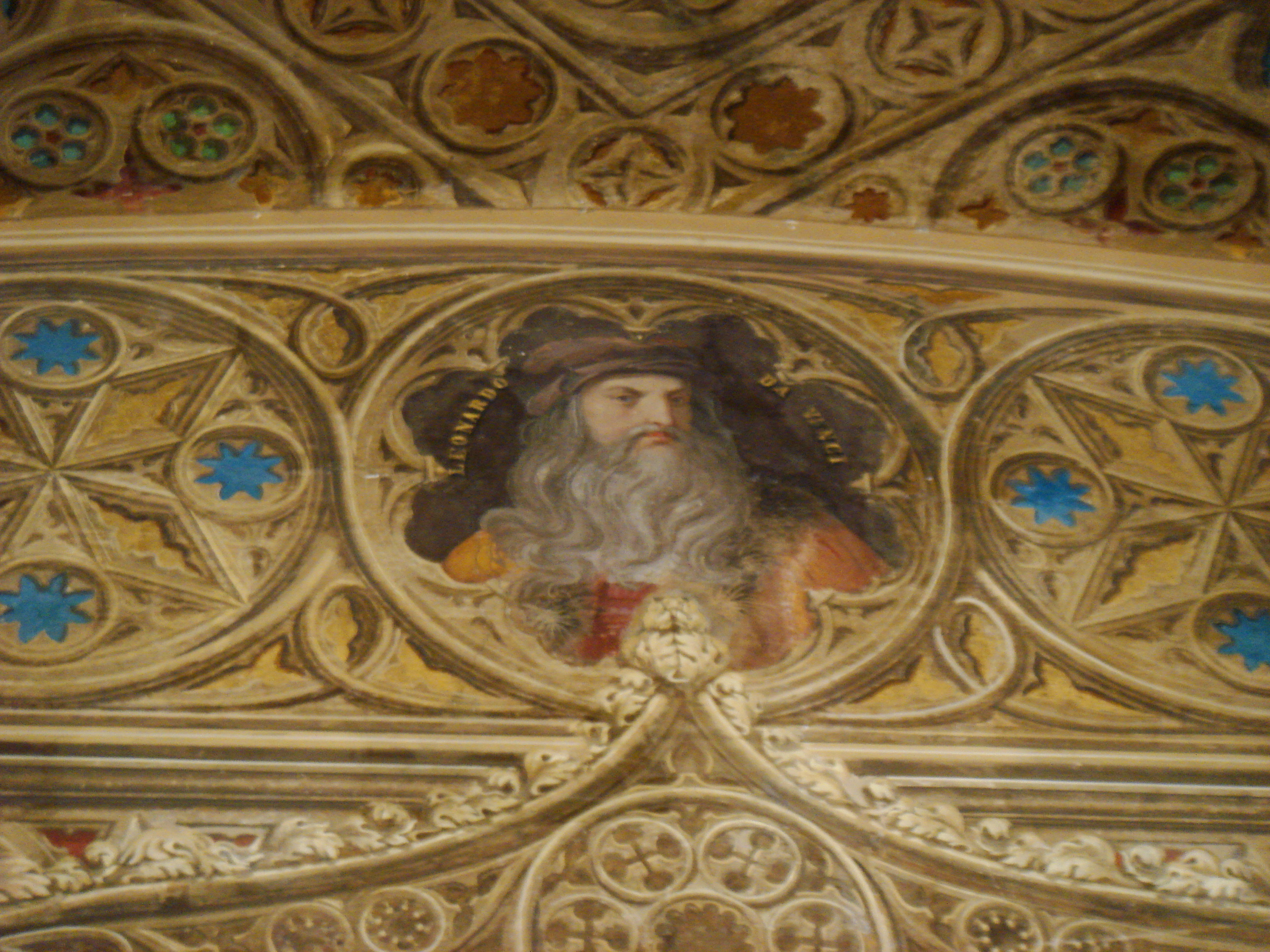
Da Vinci

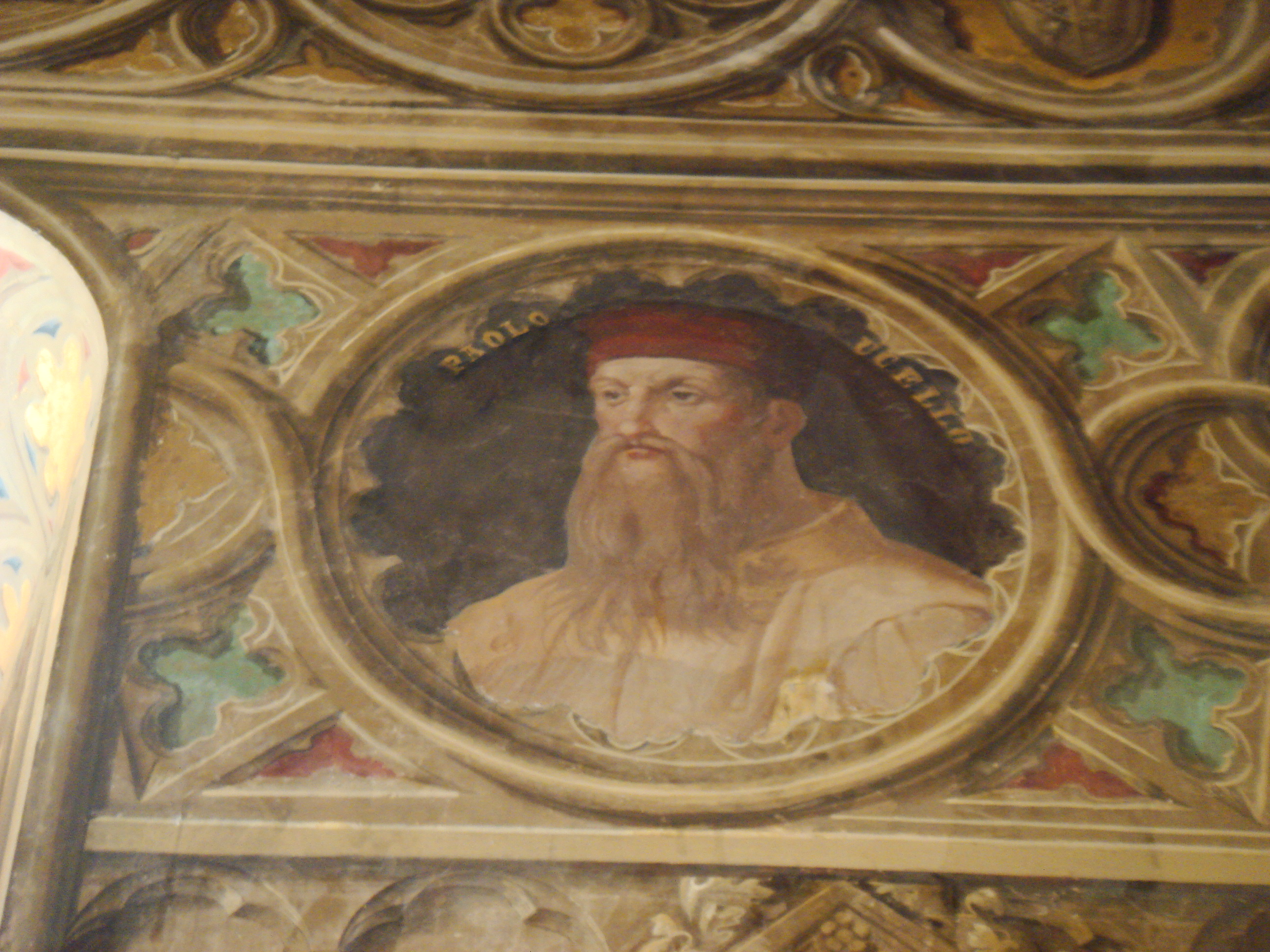
Paolo Ucello

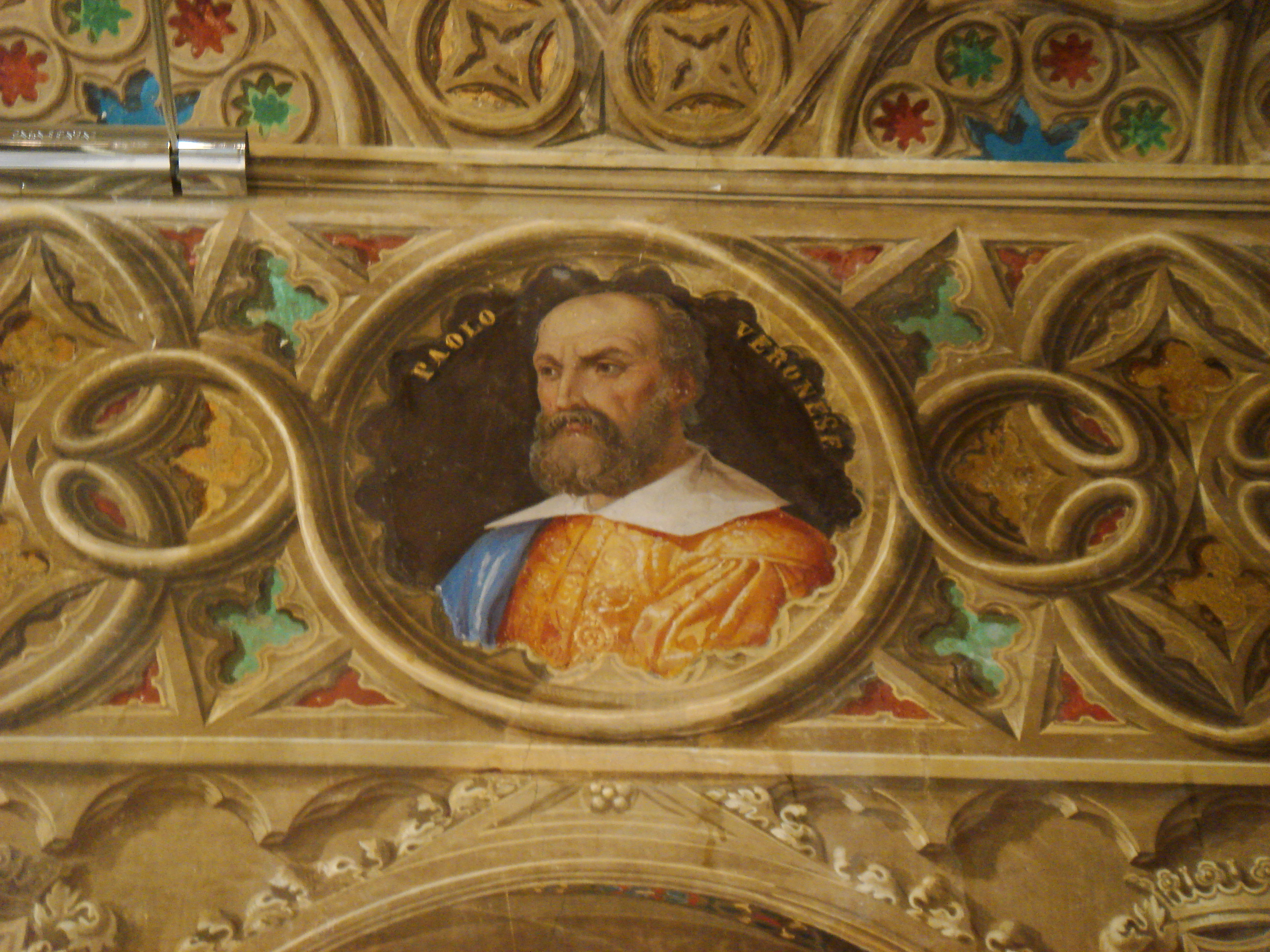
Paolo Veronese

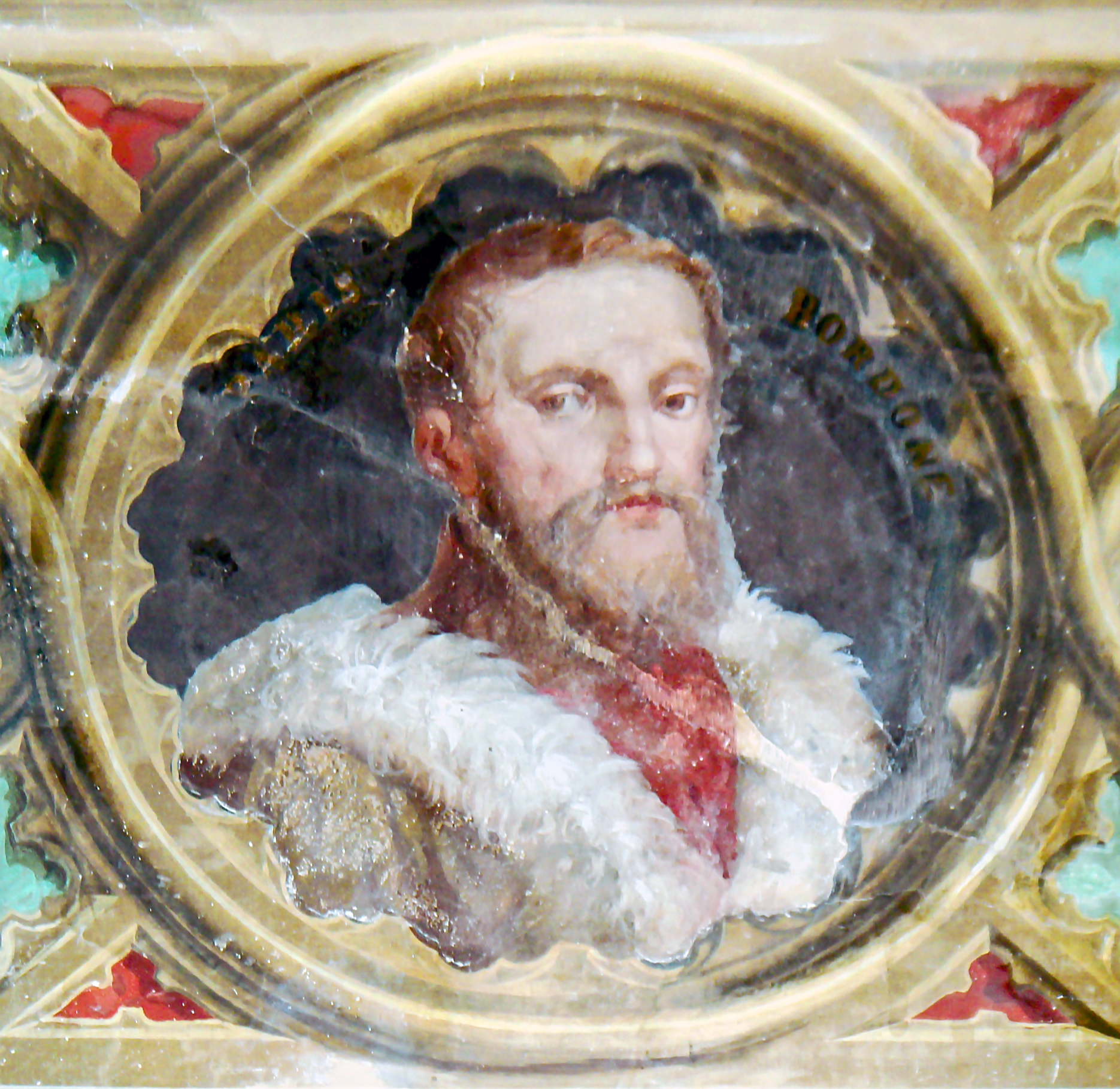
Paris Bordone

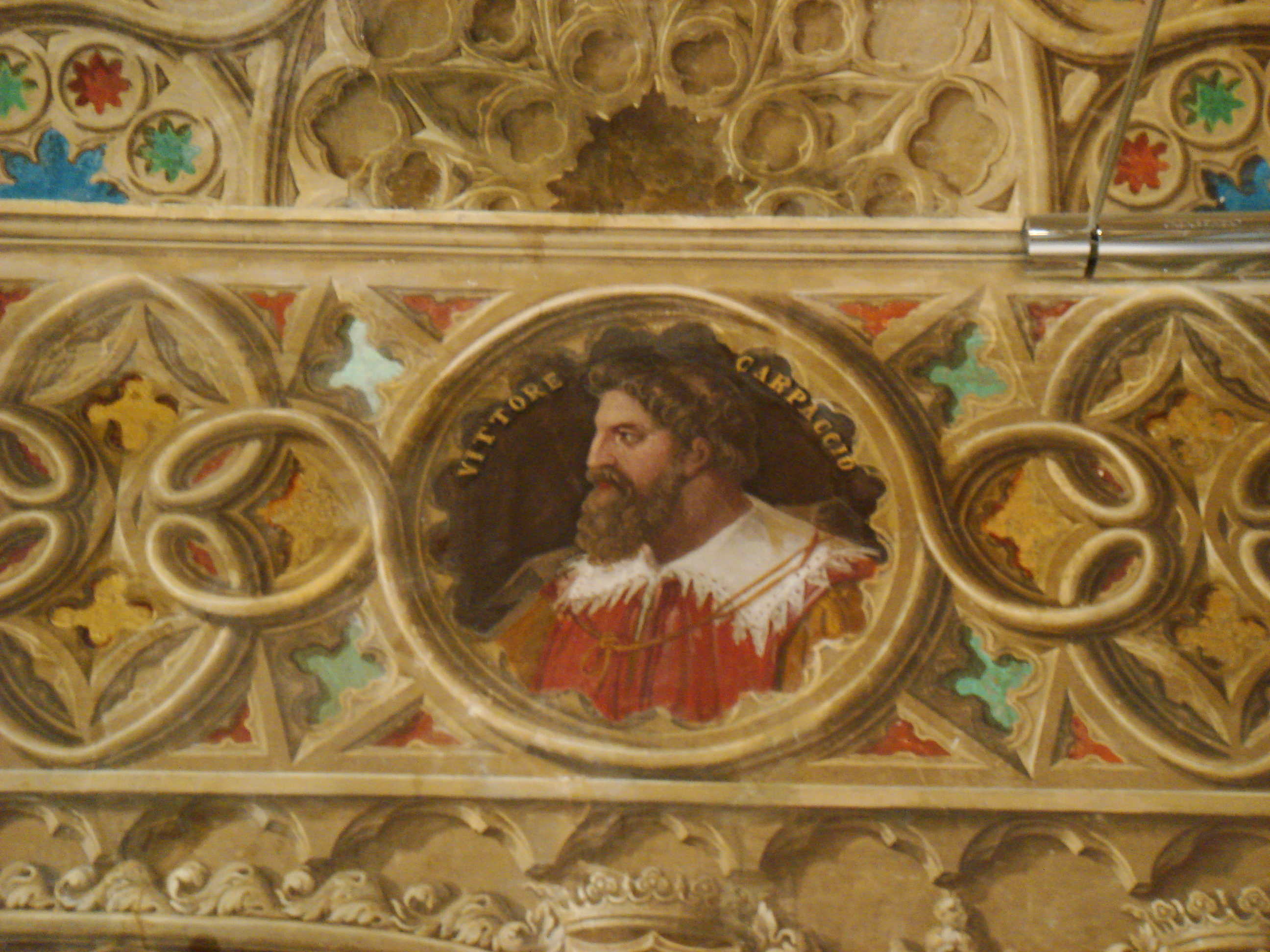
Carpaccio

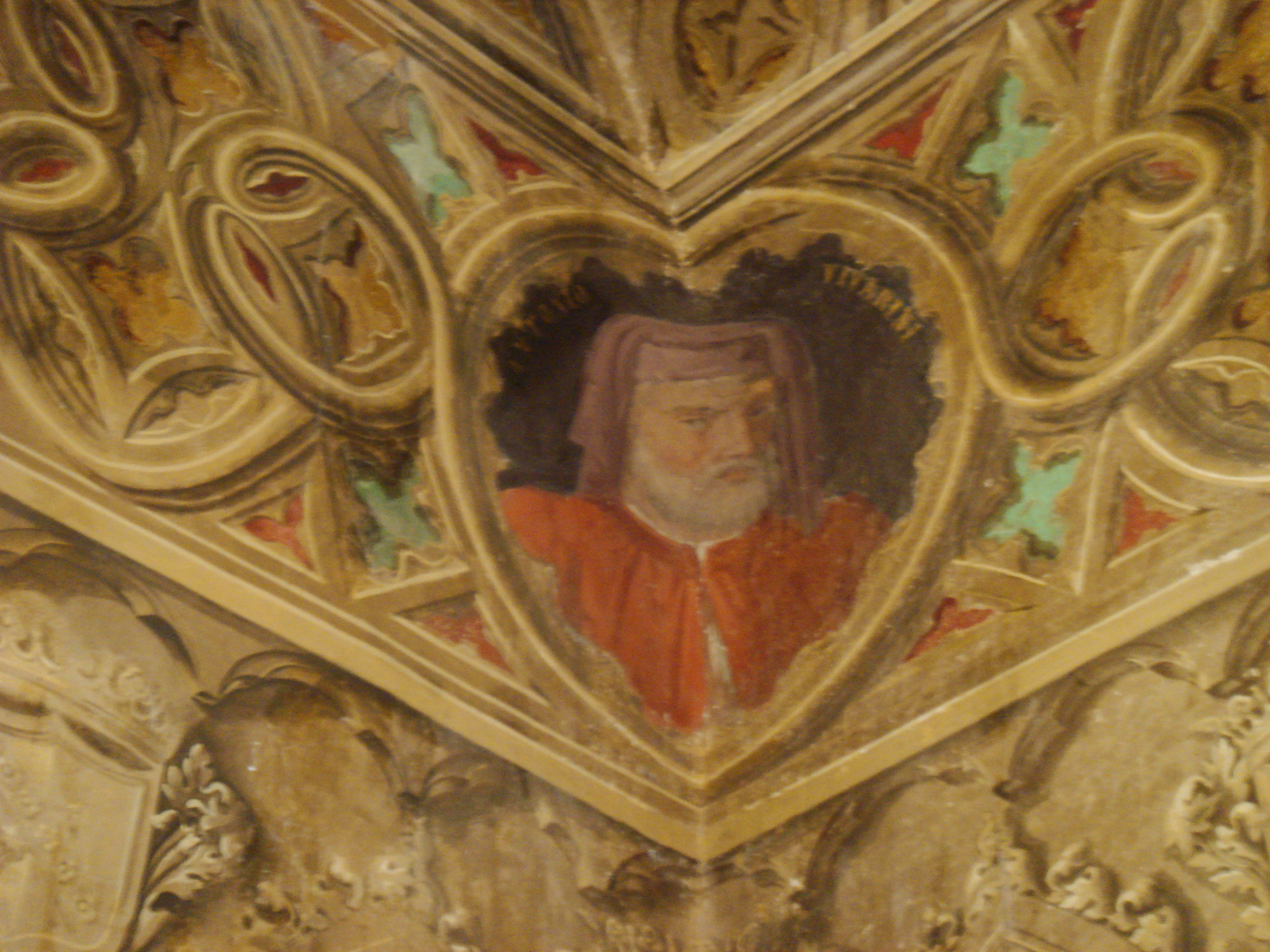
Vivarini

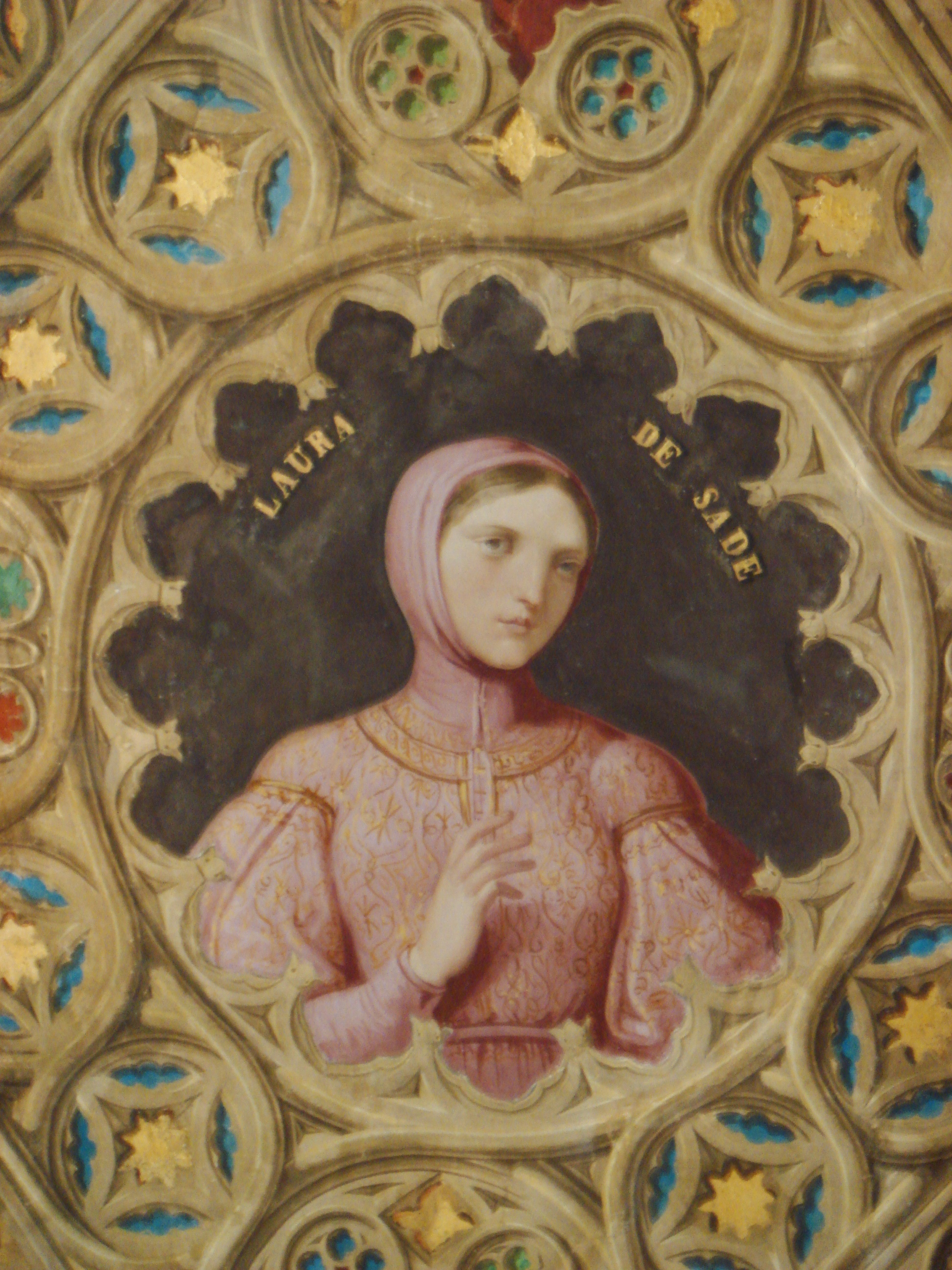
Laura De Sade
