= Giovanni De Min (painter) =

Italian painter

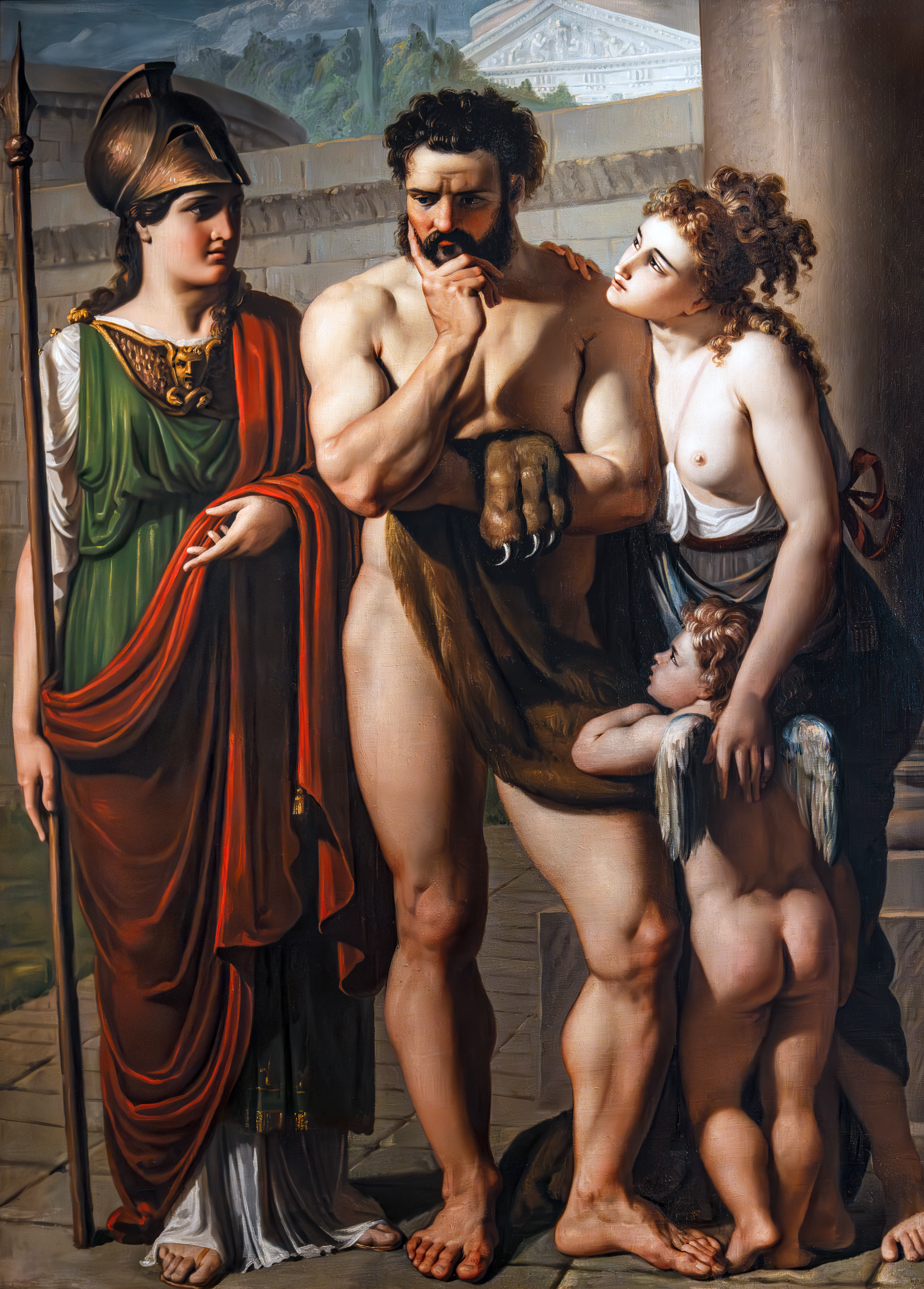
The choice of Hercules 1812 - Gallerie dell'Accademia Venice

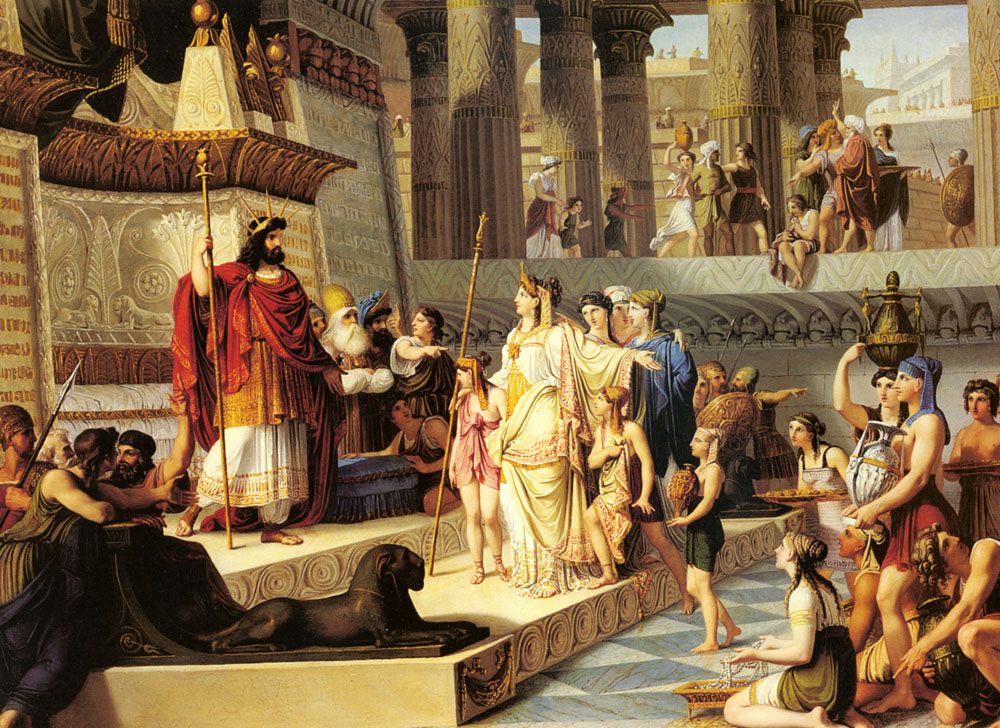
The Queen of Sheba

Giovanni De Min (Belluno, October 24, 1786- Tarzo, November 23, 1859) was an Italian painter and engraver, active in a Neoclassic style.

== Biography ==
His parents were of humble origins; his mother, Lucia Schiochet, was the domestic servant of Francesco Maria Colle, a professor of the Atheneum of Padua. In Padua, Demin first apprenticed with Paolo De Filippi, who noting his skills, and with the patronage of the Falier family of San Vitale, had him enrolled by 1804 at the Academy of Fine Arts of Venice, directed by Lattanzio Querena. There he studied alongside Francesco Hayez, and was a pupil of the painter Teodoro Matteini and Pietro Tantini. In 1808, De Min was awarded a stipend from the academy to study in Rome. There he fell under the influence of neoclassical artists such as Canova.

Returning to Venice, De Min mainly dedicated himself to fresco or panel decoration of houses and salons. His decorations (1817) of mythologic themes in the Palazzo Cicognara in Venice, using designs by Hayez, are now lost. The next year, in collaboration with Hayez he helped decorate the Palazzo of the Count Giovanni Papadopoli in San Marina with depictions of Leda, Diana and Acteon, Salmace and Hermaphrodite, Callisto, Venus and the Graces. He also painted The Four Elements and The Dream of Love for the casa Comello near San Canciano in Venice. Also in 1818 in collaboration with Hayez, and in a commission arranged by the secretary of the Accademia, Antonio Diedo, he participated in the restoration of the Tintoretto canvases in the Ducal Palace. With the death of Angelo Pizzi by 1819, and with the encouragement of Count Cicognara, De Min had been named to professor of sculpture at the Accademia.

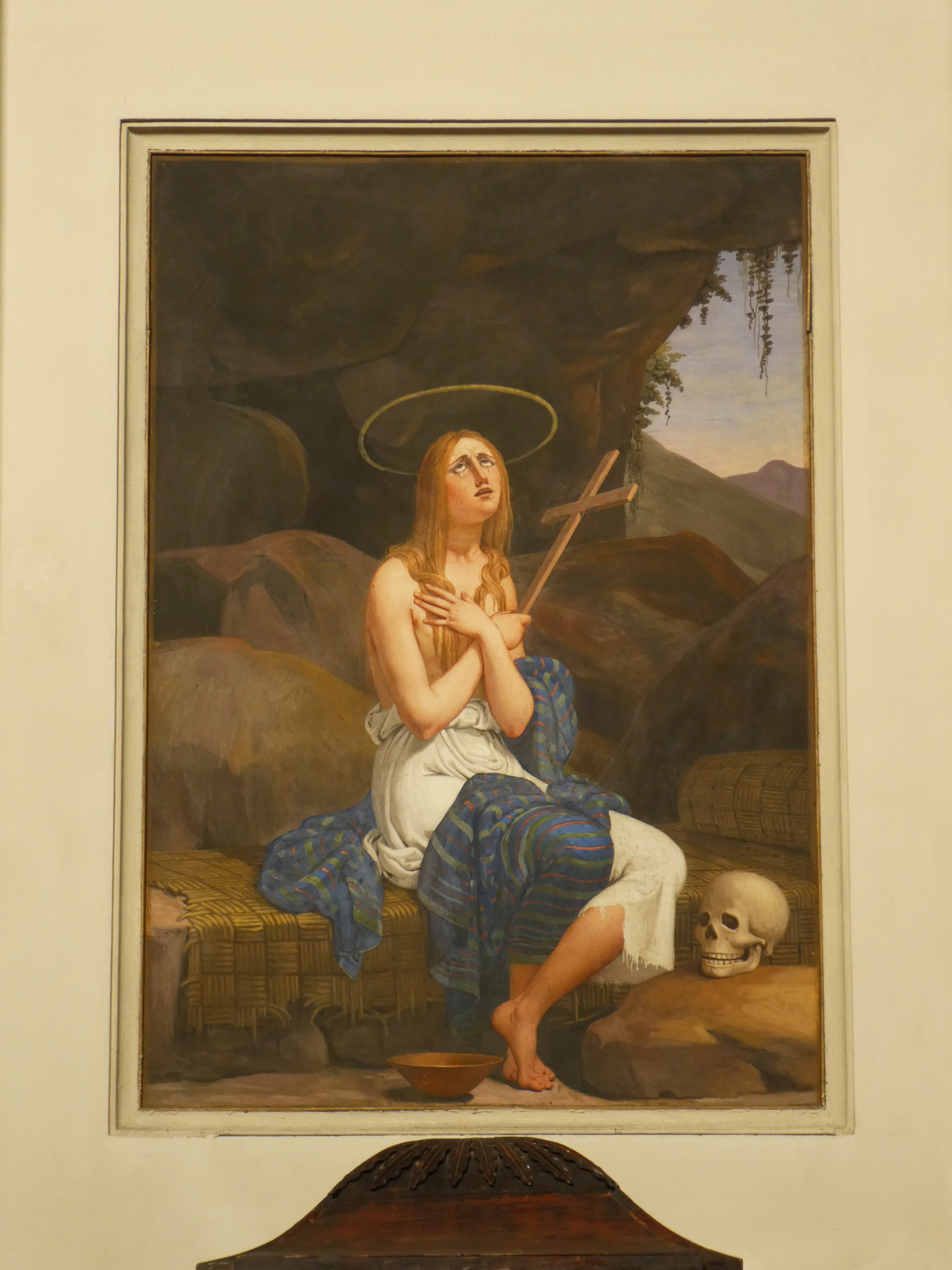
Frescos by Giovanni De Min - Saint Mary of Egypt

It is not clear how active he was as a professor, since by 1818, De Min had moved over to Padua, where he was very active. He worked on the decoration with subjects from the Iliad (1818) of the Palazzo Pesaro-Papafava. He painted a Triumph of Rossini (1822) in the Palazzo Treves de' Bonfili. In collaboration with Hayez, they painted a series of mythologic subjects: Convito degli Dei, Triumph and Marriage of Bacchus and Ariadne, Mars and Venus, and Venus and Ascanius (1821–24) in the Palazzo Rusconi Sacerdoti. In 1824–25, he painted the Story of Psyche, and episodes from Tasso's work in the Palazzo Gaudio. In 1825, in the Palazzo Rossi, now Moschini, he painted mythologic subjects. In 1828, in Palazzo Revedin, he painted La Fortuna, Laocoon, Ulysses kills Procedus. In this same decade he painted the Education of Achilles and Apotheosis of Canova in Palazzo Crescini-Trieste. For the casa Fasolo, he painted Erminia saves Tancred, Jove and Juno, Leda. Finally from 1829 to 1831, he frescoed the Story of Psyche for the Palazzo Treves de' Bonfili in Venice, a palace where Ludovico Lipparini, Borsato, Cicognara and others were employed. He also painted a large historic canvas of the Massacre of Alberico da Romano and his family, which only is now known through an 1839 lithography by Francesco Locatello.

Demin late in life moved to Ceneda, near present-day Vittorio Veneto, and painted frescoes in churches and Villas in Veneto including La Lotta delle Spartane in Villa dei Patt near Belluno. He also painted the Council Hall of the Palazzo Rosso in Belluno and in 1837 a salon of Villa Gera in Conegliano.

He painted large oil canvases depicting the Resurrection of Lazzarus (1825), The Exile of the Ezzelini and the Profanation of the Temple for the church in Auronzo. In 1830, he painted the Apostles in fresco for the church of Possagno, a Final Judgement for a church in Paderno, Queen Saba before Solomon and the St Saba embarks for Constantinople (1846). He painted the Defeat of the Fallen Angels for the church of Caneva.

He engraved a series of scenes in Honor of the Empress Caroline Augusta of Bavaria (1818).

One of his pupils was Pietro Paolétti.
