= Canal Grande (Trieste) =

Canal in Trieste, Friuli-Venezia-Giulia, Italy

Coordinates: 45°39′09″N 13°46′17″E

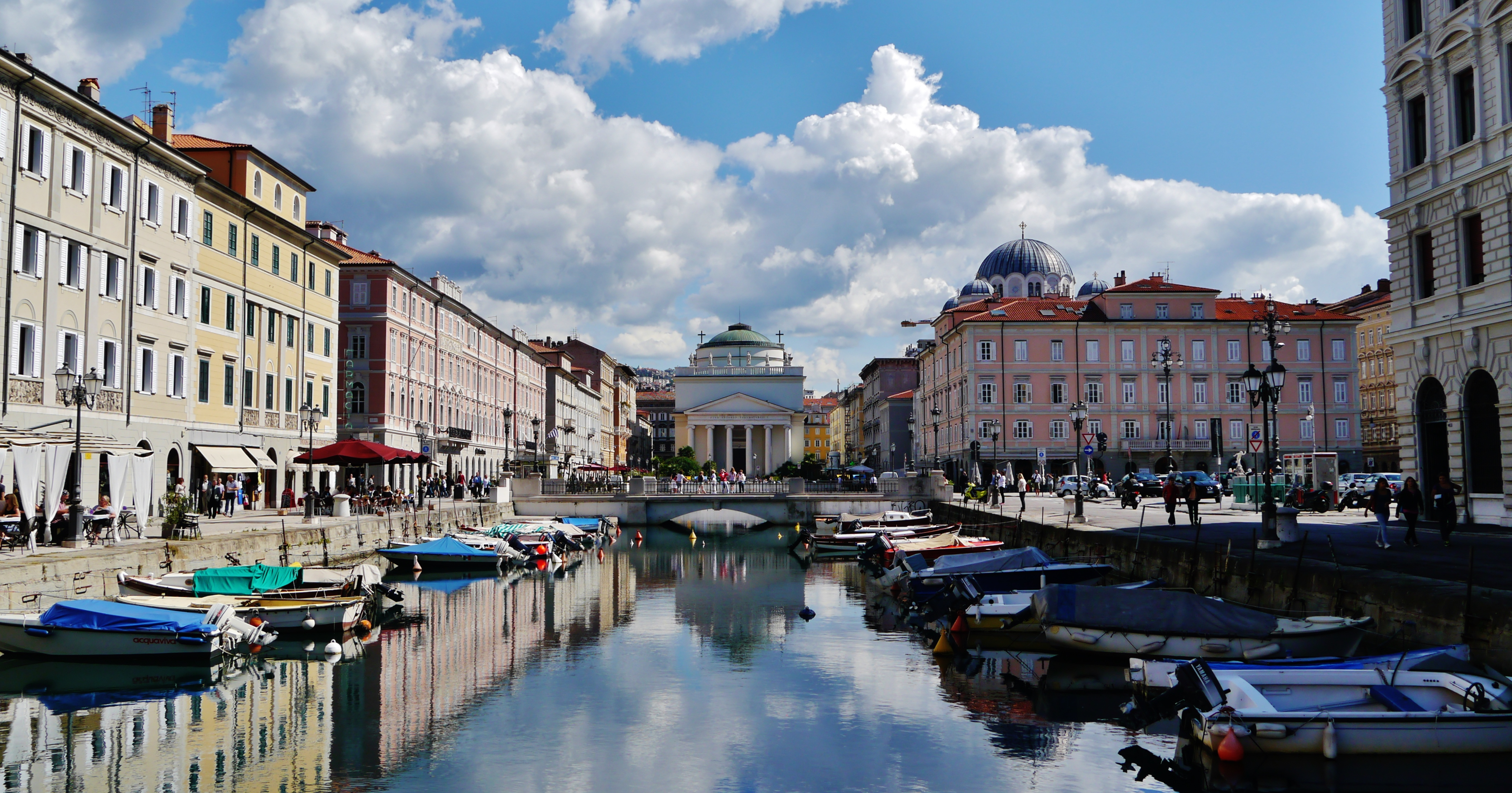
The Canal Grande

The Canal Grande (English: "Grand Canal") is a navigable canal located in the heart of the Borgo Teresiano, in the very center of the city of Trieste, approximately halfway between the railway station and Piazza Unità d'Italia. The Canal Grande was a key element of the new urban plan that led to the construction of Borgo Teresiano.

== History ==
It was built between 1754 and 1756 by the Venetian Matteo Pirona, further digging the main collector of the salt pans, when these were buried to allow the urban development of the city outside its walls. It was built so that boats could come directly to the city center to unload their goods.

In its initial conformation, the canal was longer than it is today, reaching as far as the church of Sant'Antonio. The terminal part of the canal was buried in 1934, with rubble resulting from the demolition of the old city, thus obtaining the current Piazza Sant'Antonio. In the burial it is said that a small torpedo boat, moored there in failure and abandoned since the end of the war, was also buried, although from the photographs of the time, depicting the burial works, no hull can be seen.

== Buildings ==
The canal area is overlooked by:

- the Aedes building, known as the "red skyscraper" (1928 – architect Arduino Berlam) (main façade on the Rive);
- the Gopcevich palace (1850 – architect Giovanni Andrea Berlam), whose façade is distinguished by the particular design with red and yellow Greek frets. It is home to the Carlo Schmidl Theater Museum;
- the neoclassical church of Sant'Antonio Taumaturgo (1849 – architect Pietro Nobile), known to the citizens as Sant'Antonio Nuovo;
- the Stella Polare coffee, one of the historic cafes of Trieste;
- the Saint Spyridon Church (1869 – architect Carlo Maciachini), with its characteristic light blue domes;
- the Genel palace (1873 – Domenico Monti ) (main facade on piazza Ponterosso);
- the Carciotti palace (1805 – architect Matteo Pertsch ) (main facade on the banks).

== The bridges ==
The canal is now crossed by two bridges and a pedestrian walkway.

- The Ponte Rosso ("Red Bridge"), halfway through the canal, it was built in wood in 1756, as soon as the construction of the canal was completed. It was then the only existing bridge, as the other bridges were built at a later time. It was rebuilt for the first time about ten years later and then rebuilt once again, this time in iron, in 1832. On the Red Bridge there is the statue of Irish writer James Joyce, who lived in the city. At the four ends of the bridge there are four lanterns positioned on the parapets that previously adorned the statue of Trieste's devotion to Austria which was once located in Piazza Libertà, in front of the railway station. The statue was inaugurated in 1889 and removed in 1919, when Trieste became part of Italy.
- The Ponte Verde ("Green Bridge"), at the beginning of the canal, it was built in iron in 1858. In 1904, another bridge was added to it, called the Ponte Bianco ("White Bridge") or Ponte Nuovo, over which passed the railway that connected the old port to the new port, passing through the Rive. At the beginning of the canal, close to the bridge, there is a slipway.

The name of the bridges derives from the color in which their structures were originally painted. At the time of their construction the bridges were revolving or opening, to let sailing ships access the canal. The movable bridges were later replaced by the current fixed masonry bridges, which, however, only allow the passage of small boats during low tide. The Ponte Rosso was replaced in 1925, and the Ponte Verde in 1950. The Green Bridge and the White Bridge thus became a single structure.

A 25 m-long (82 ft) pedestrian walkway, laid over the canal on 4 December 2012 and inaugurated on 23 March 2013, connects Via Cassa di Risparmio with Via Trento. It is made in steel, 120 cm-high (47 in) unbreakable glass parapets and a handrail on both sides, under which there are LED bodies that illuminate the walkway, covered in Istrian stone and steel. The bridge is officially named Passaggio Joyce ("Passage Joyce"), and is also known as "Ponte Curto", due to an alleged error of measurement in the project.

== The squares ==
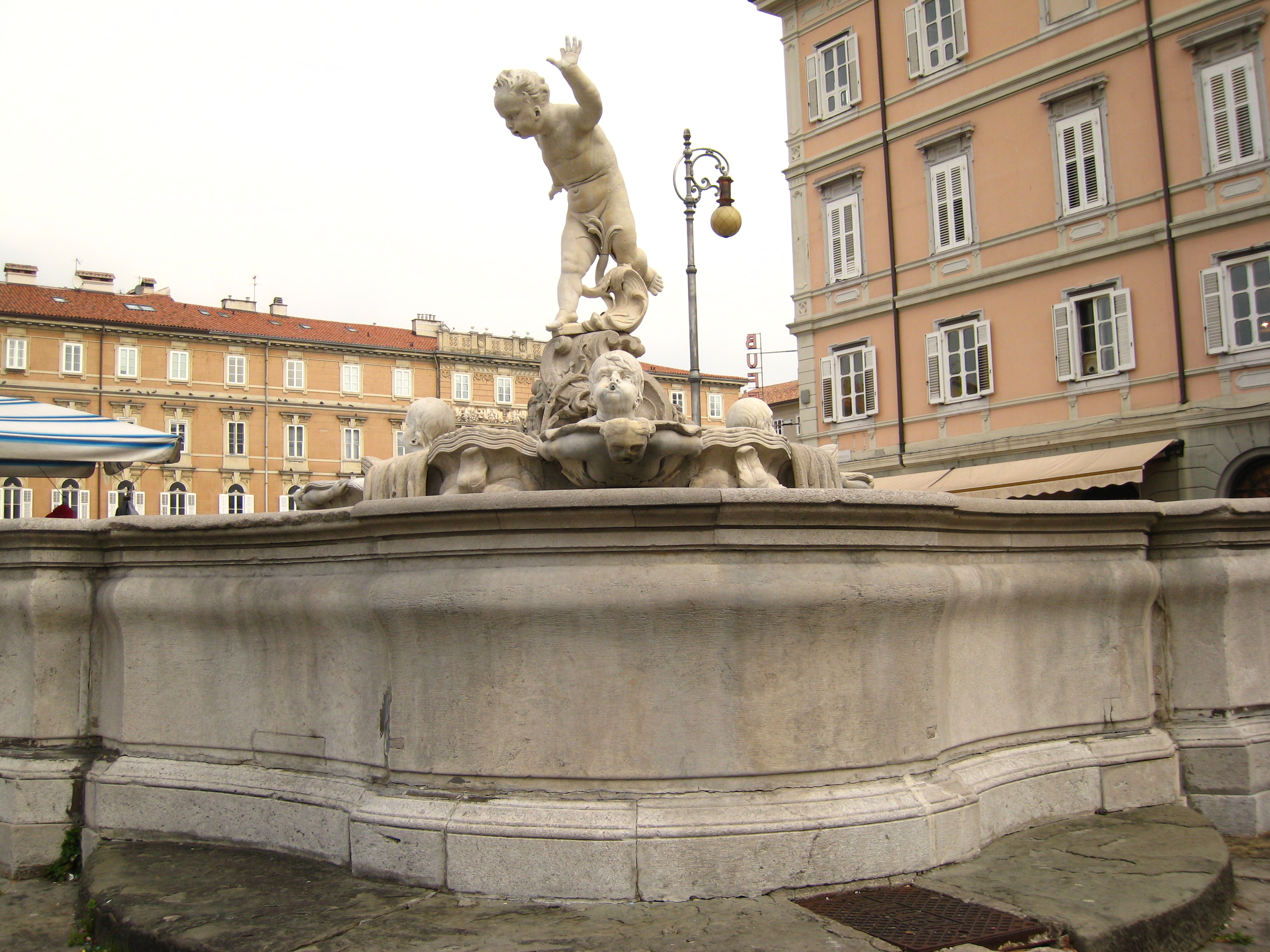
The fountain of Piazza Ponterosso

Next to the Ponterosso is the square of the same name, home to an outdoor market. Over time, the lively market has shrunk considerably. On one side of the square there is a fountain (1753 – Giovanni Battista Mazzoleni), with in the center the statue of a puttino, familiarly called Giovannin de Ponterosso, due to the fact that the water that fed it came from the San Giovanni district.

At the end of the canal there is the aforementioned Piazza Sant'Antonio, set up as a garden, with a large fountain in its center. The Stella Polare café, one of the historic cafes of Trieste, overlooks the square.

== Gallery ==
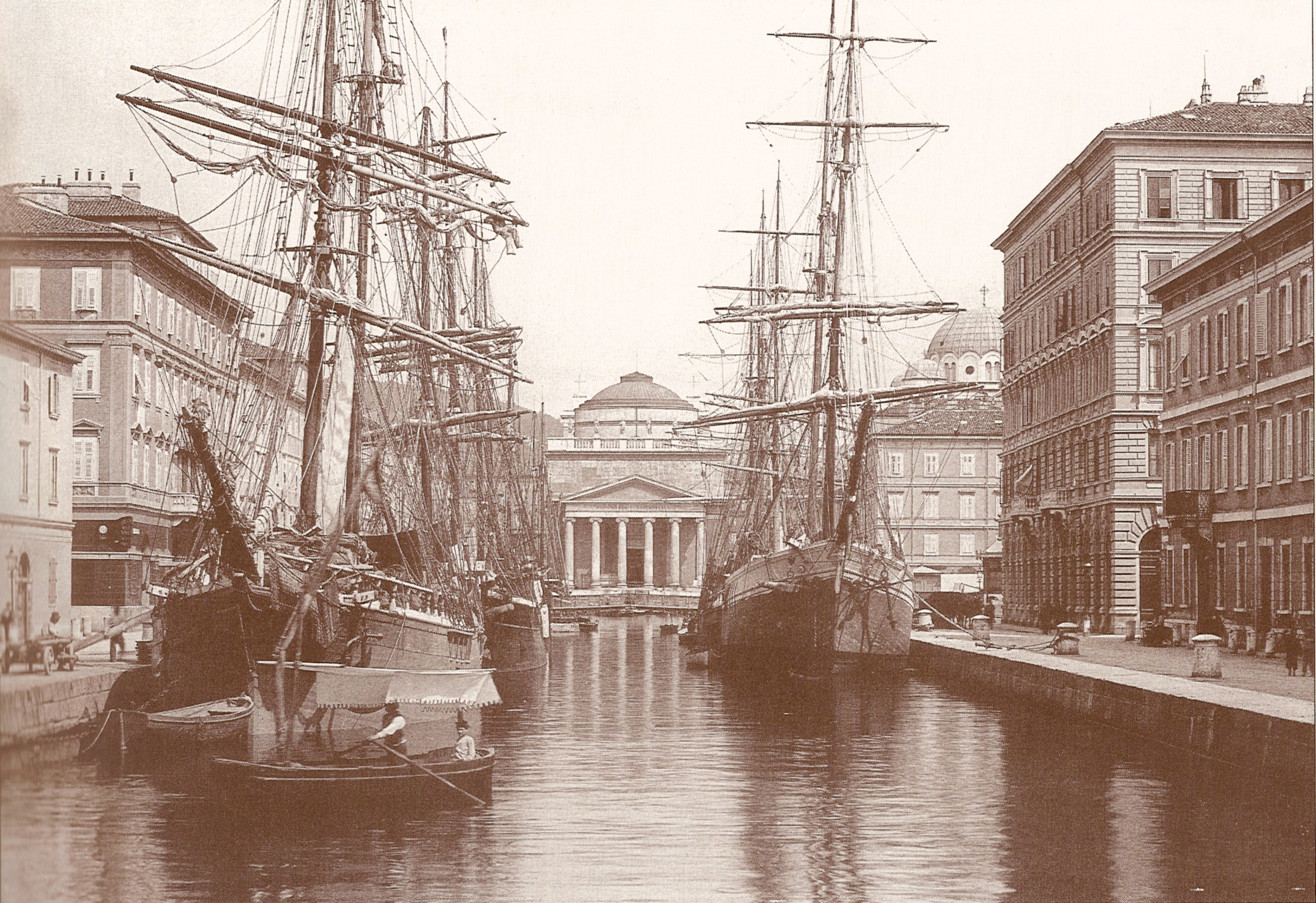
1900 stamp depicting the canal

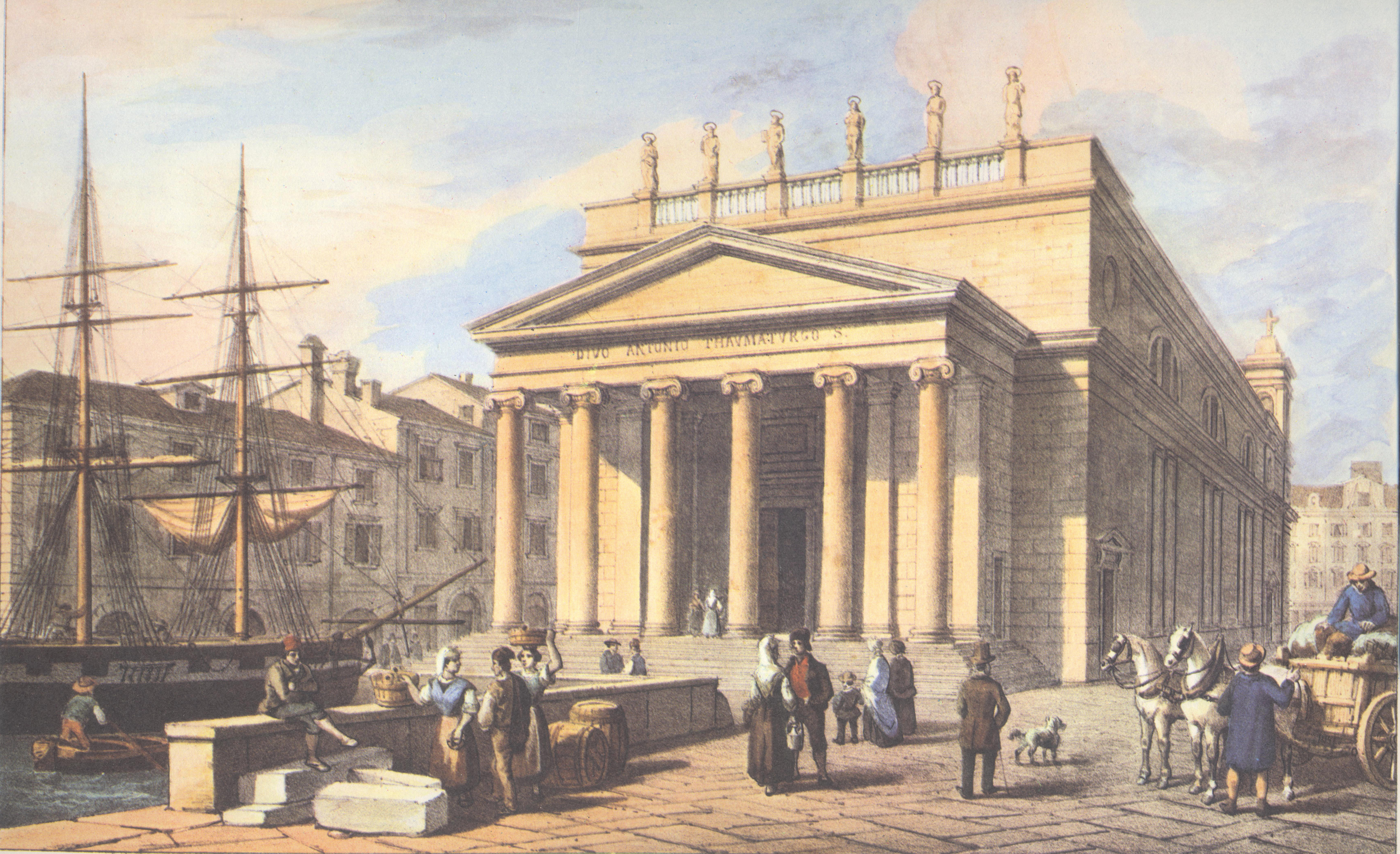
1854 drawing by Marco Moro. The channel still reached the Sant'Antonio church.

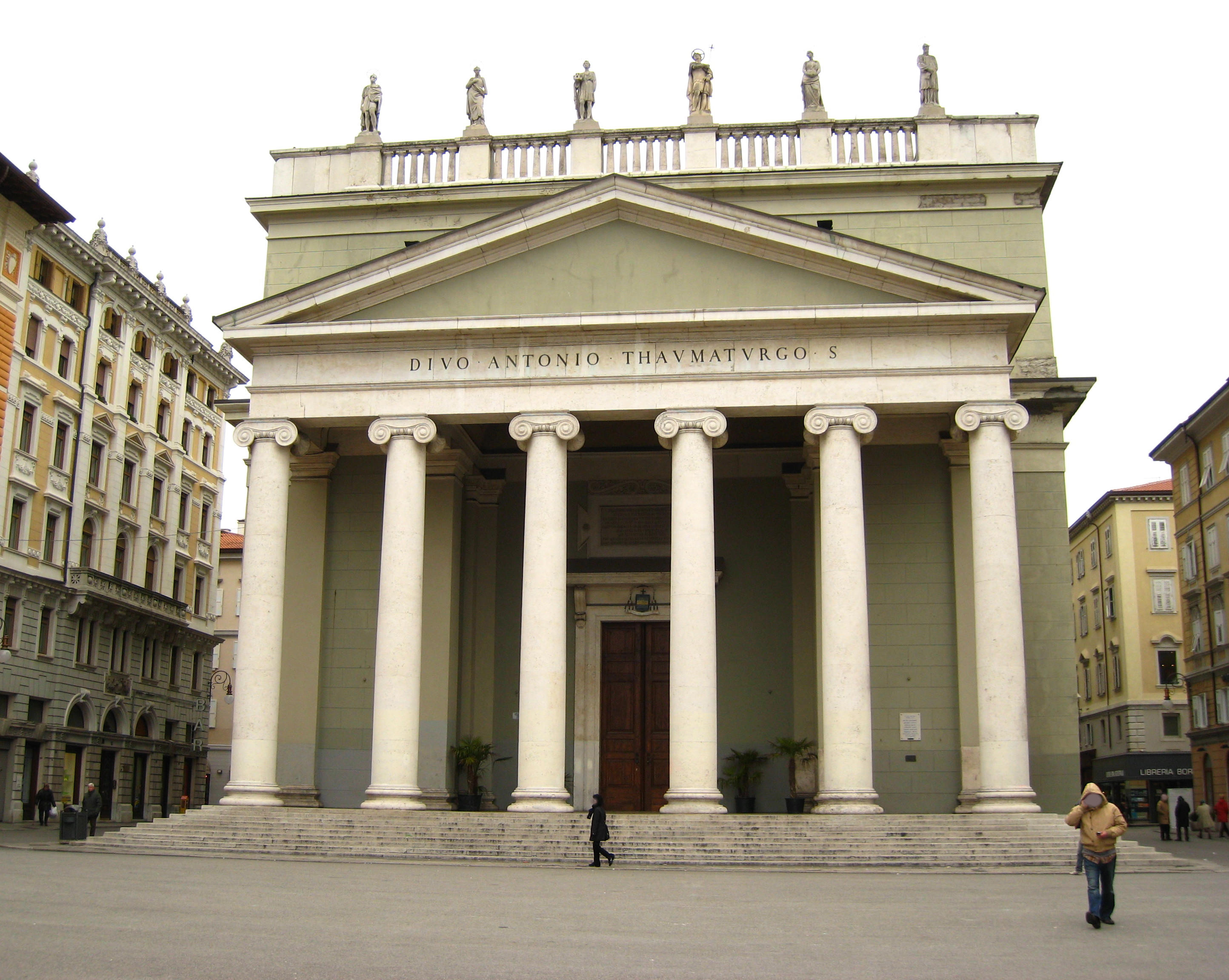
Sant'Antonio Taumaturgo

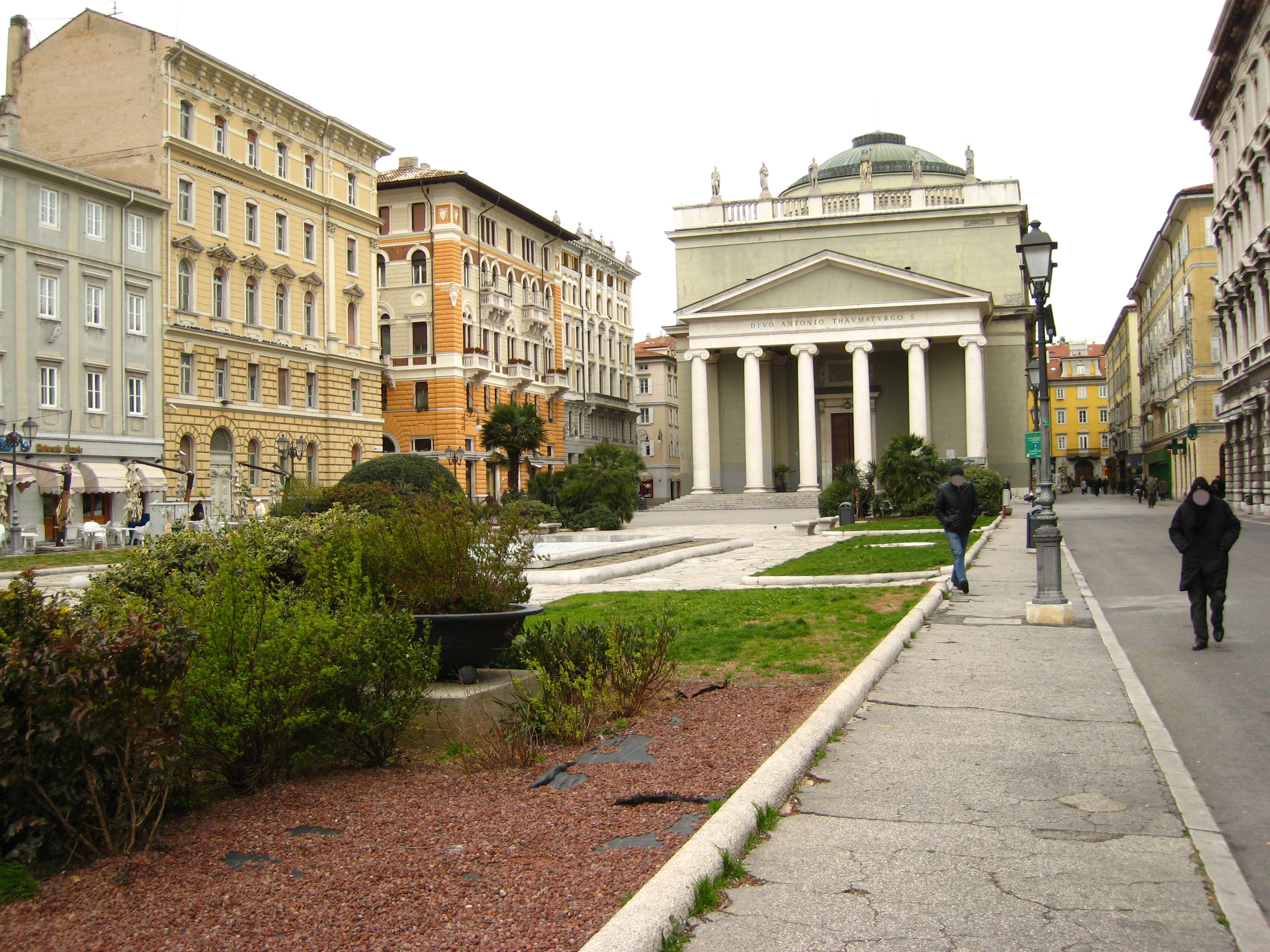
Piazza Sant'Antonio

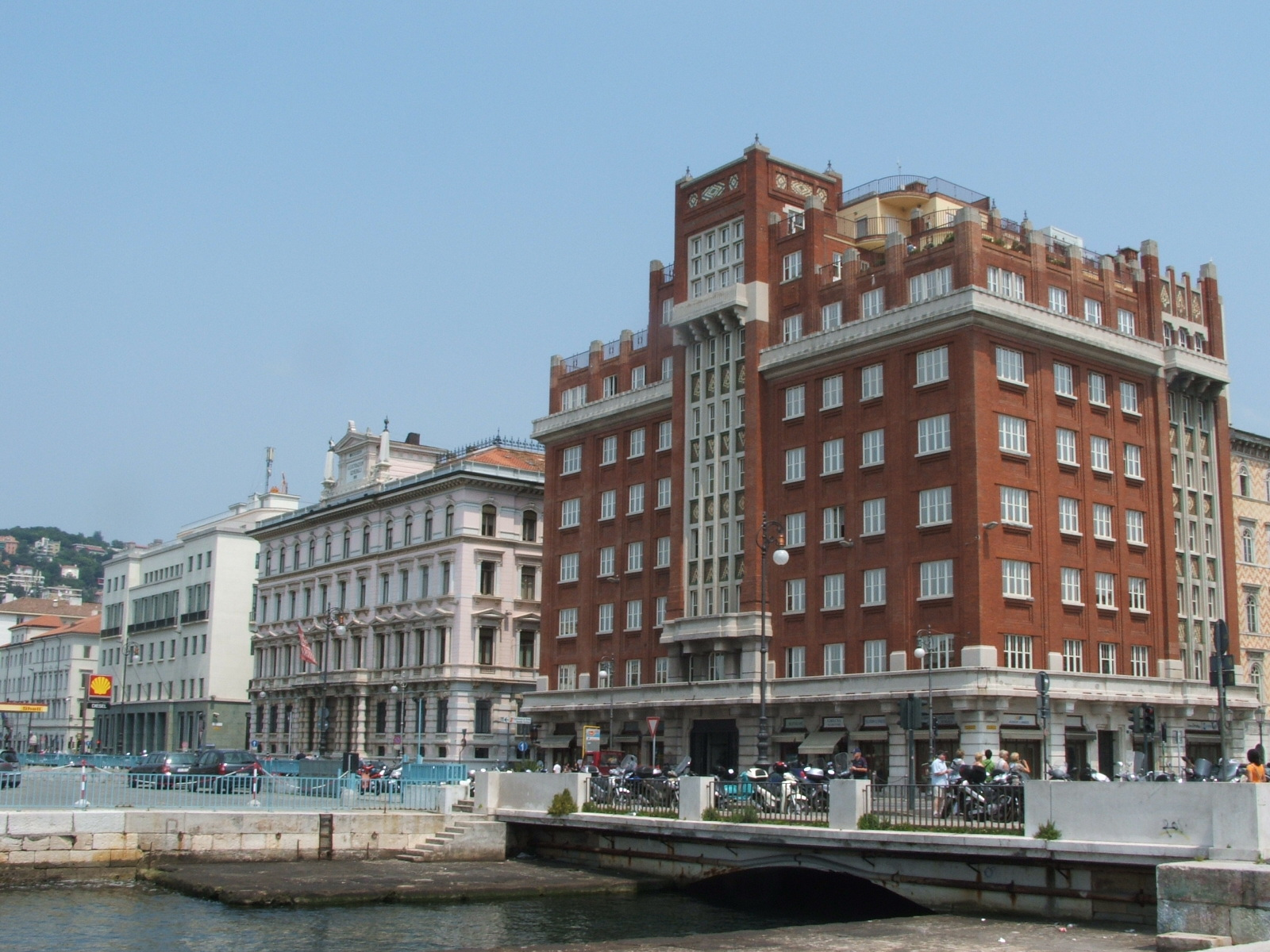
Il grattacielo rosso ("the red skyscraper")

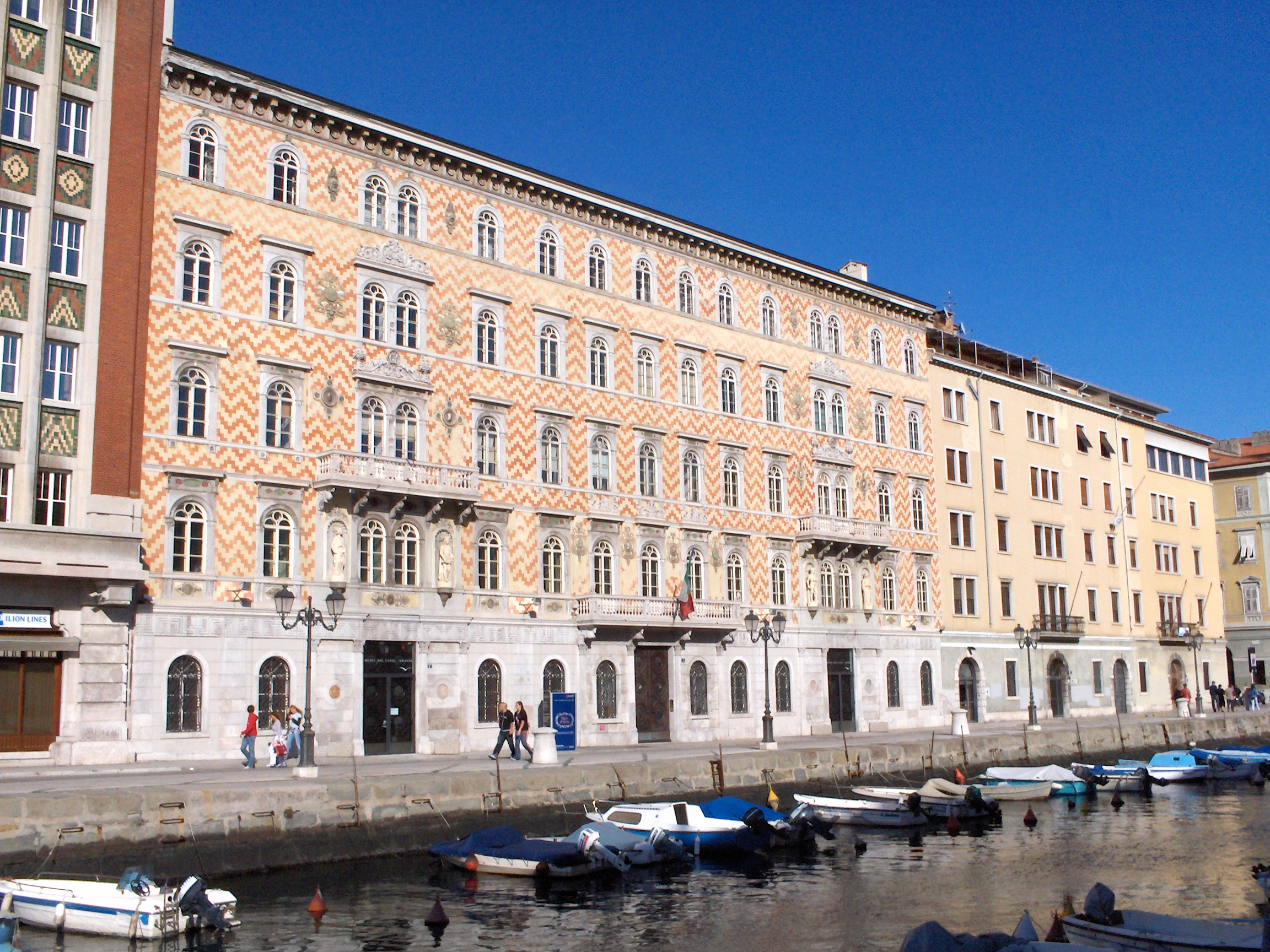
Palazzo Gopcevich

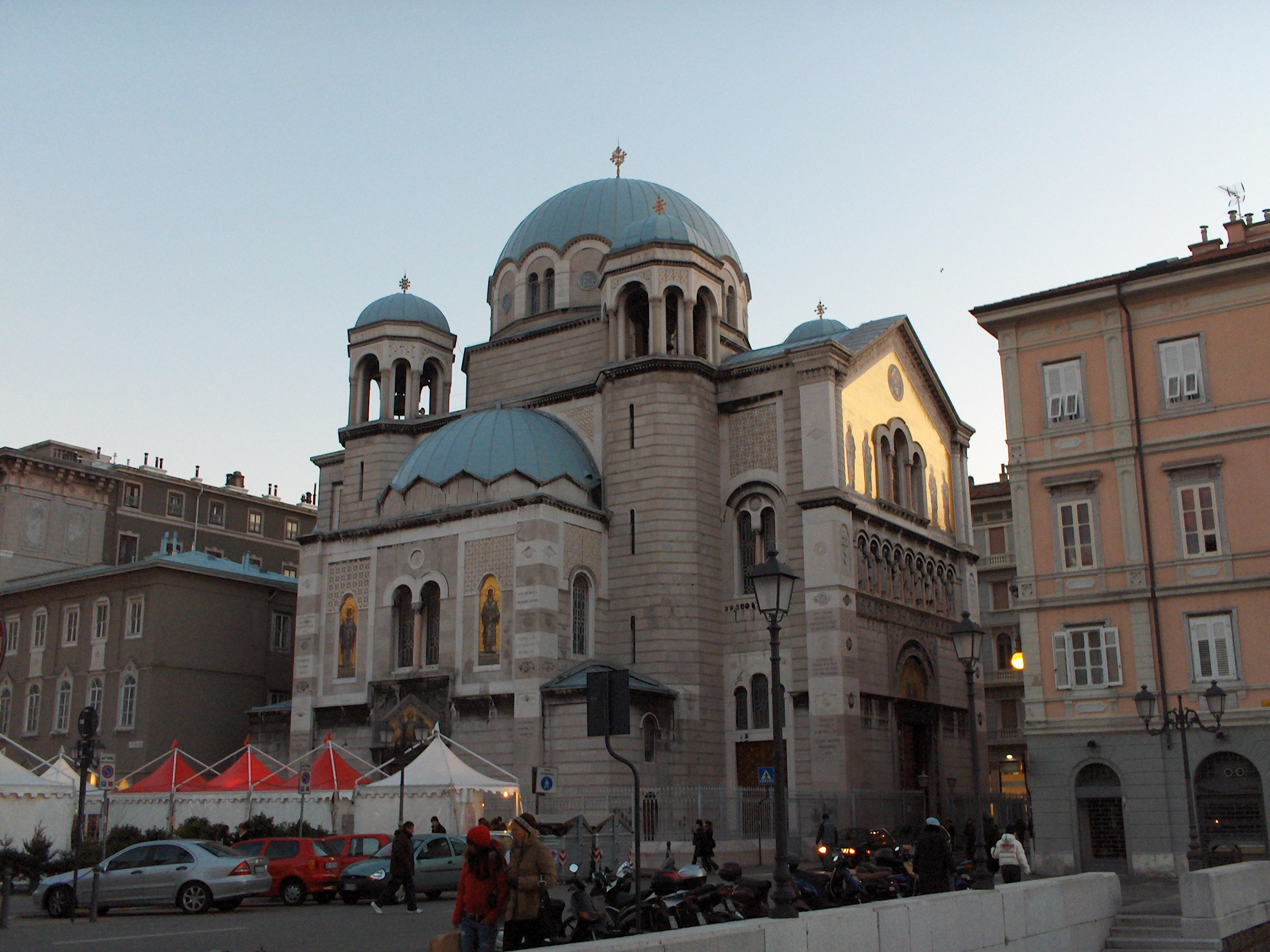
Saint Spyridon Church

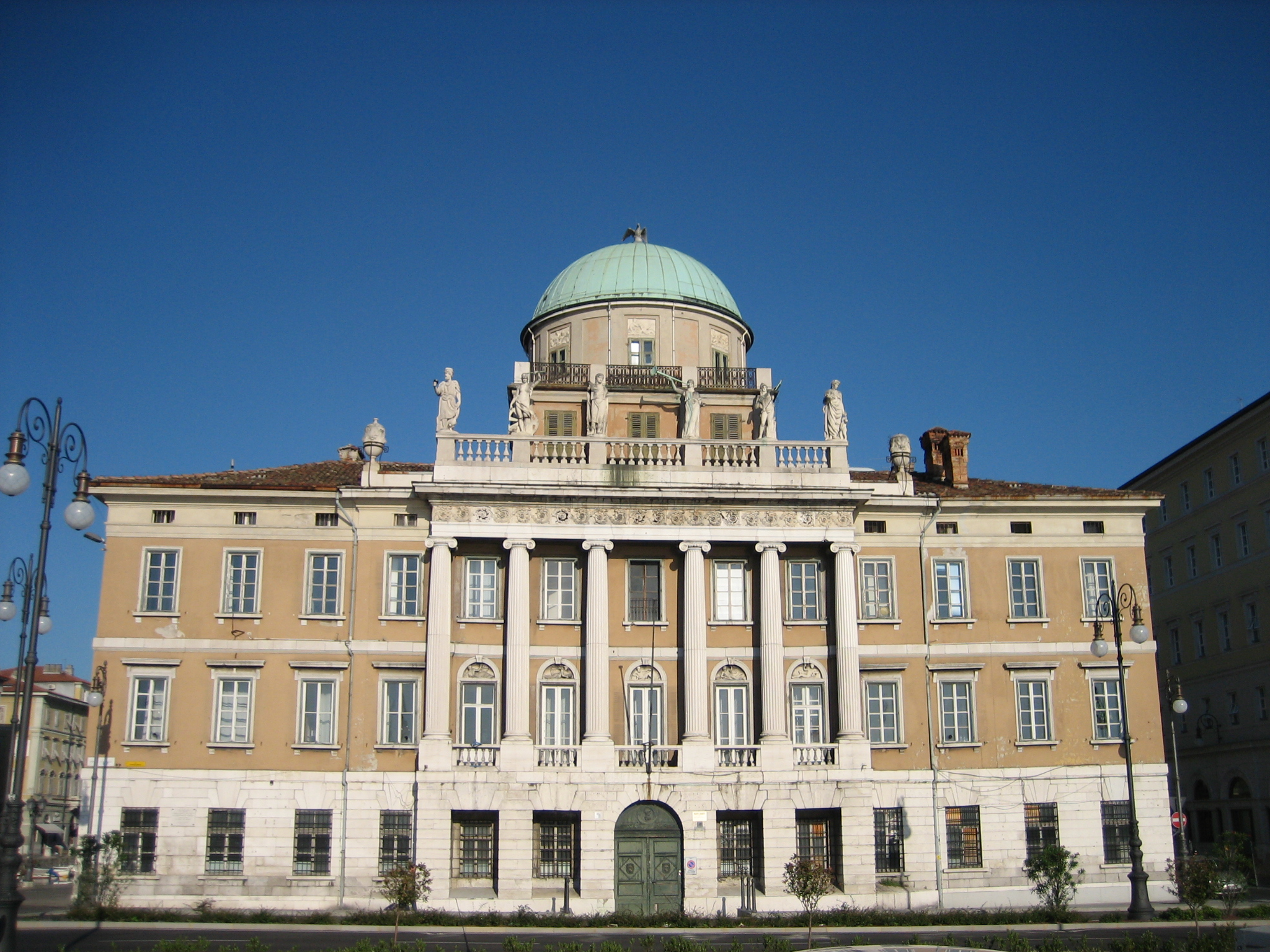
Palazzo Carciotti

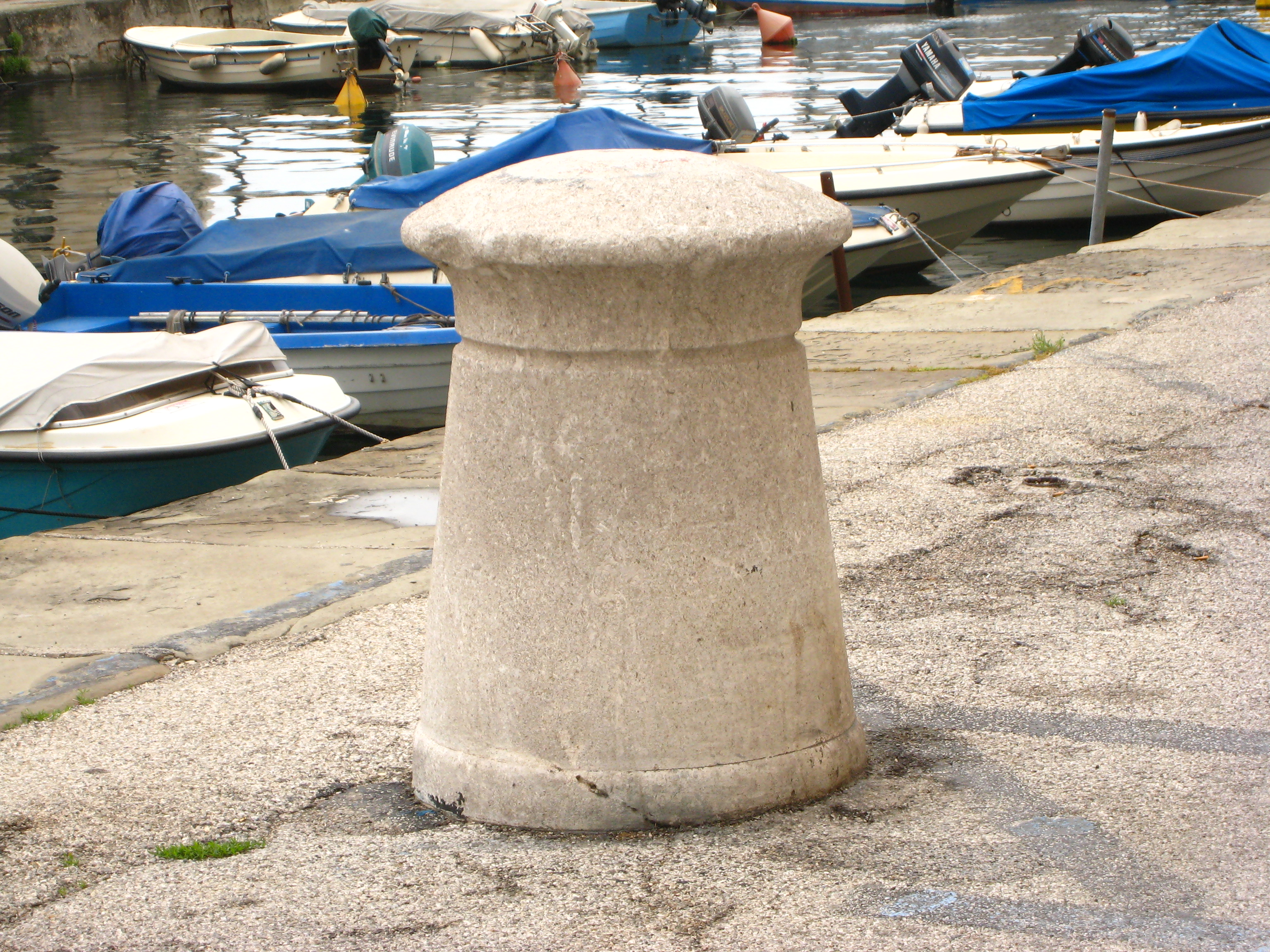
Old stone bollard, once used to moor the large vessels

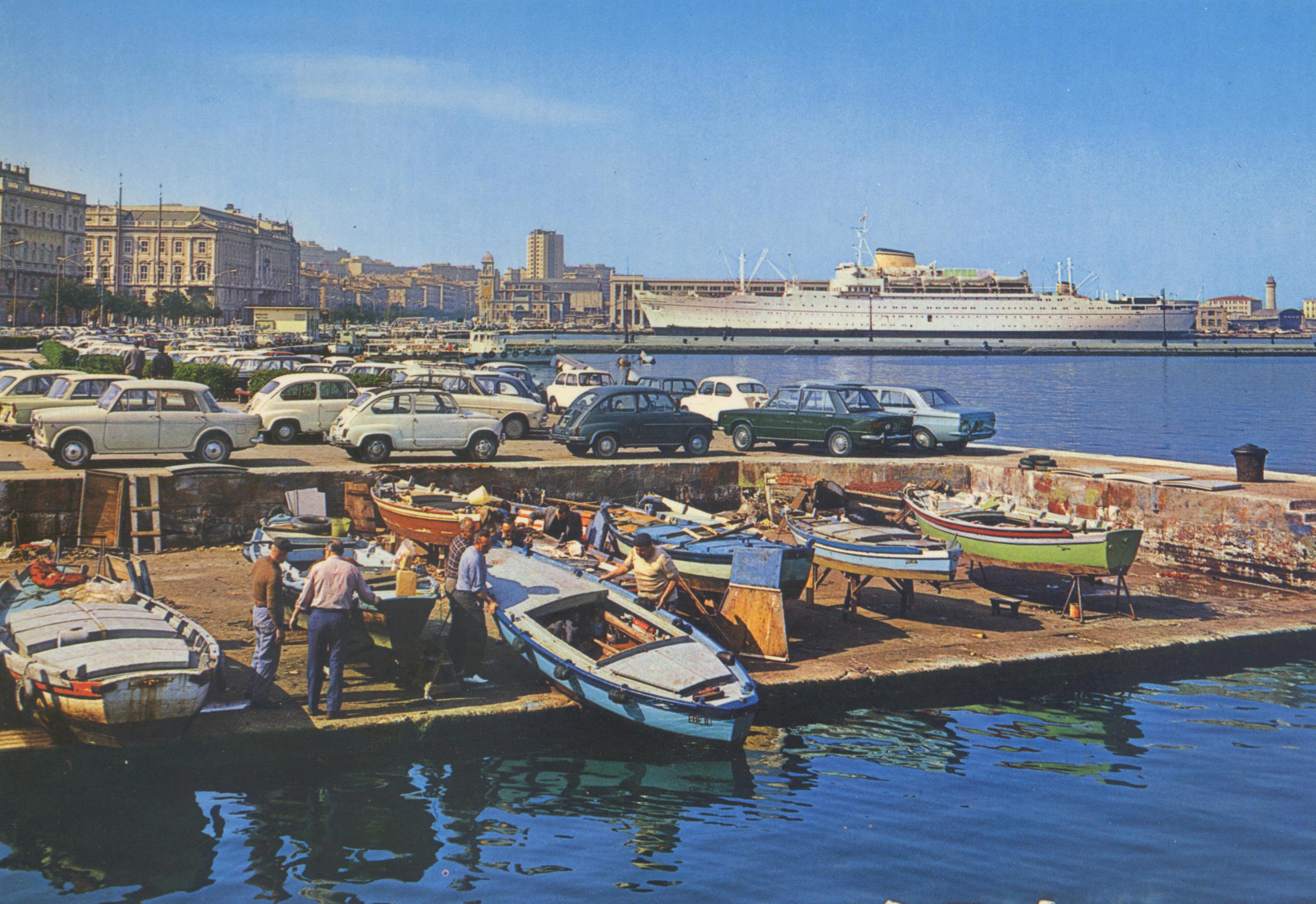
Old postcard, in which the slipway, still used, can be seen

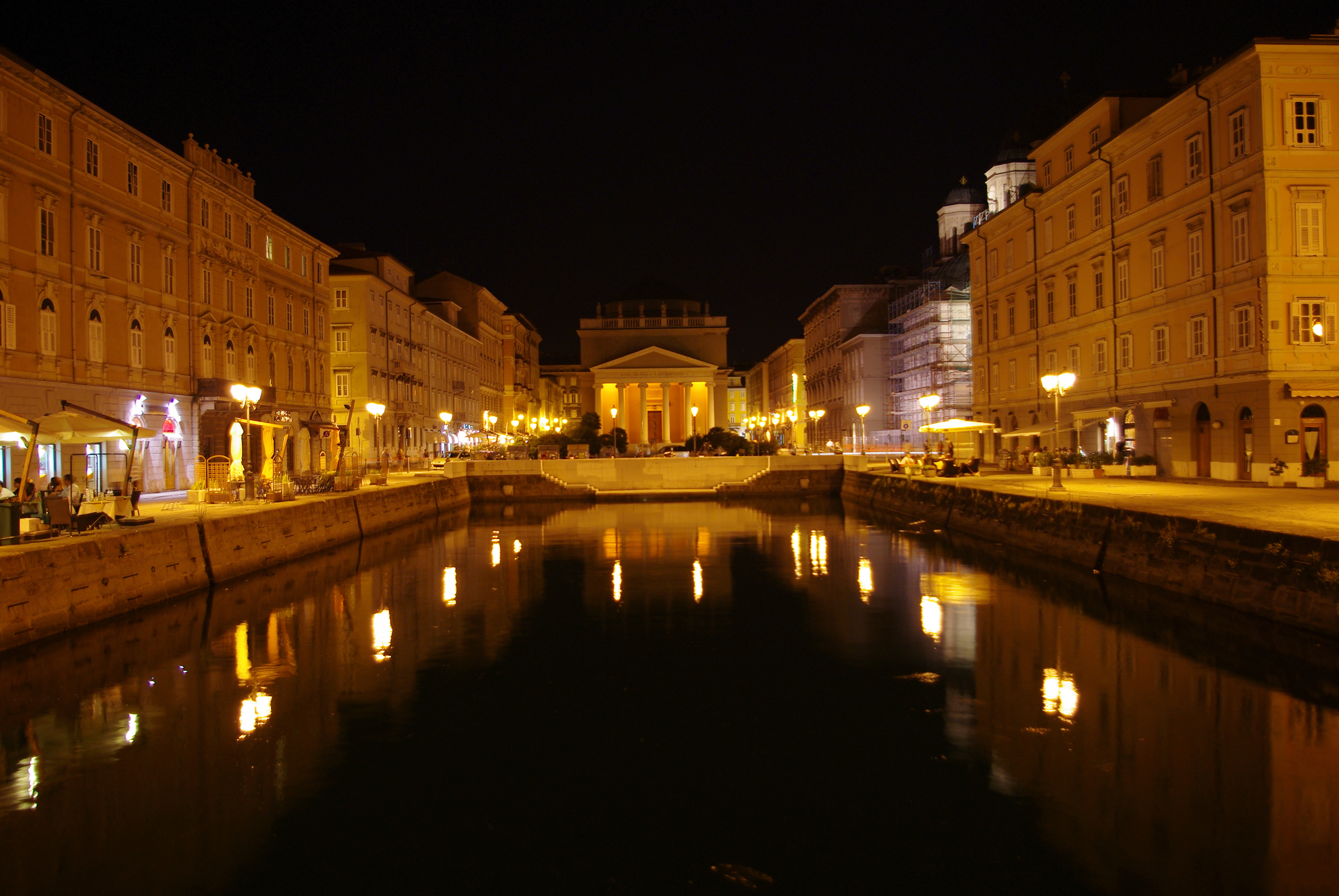
Canal Grande at night

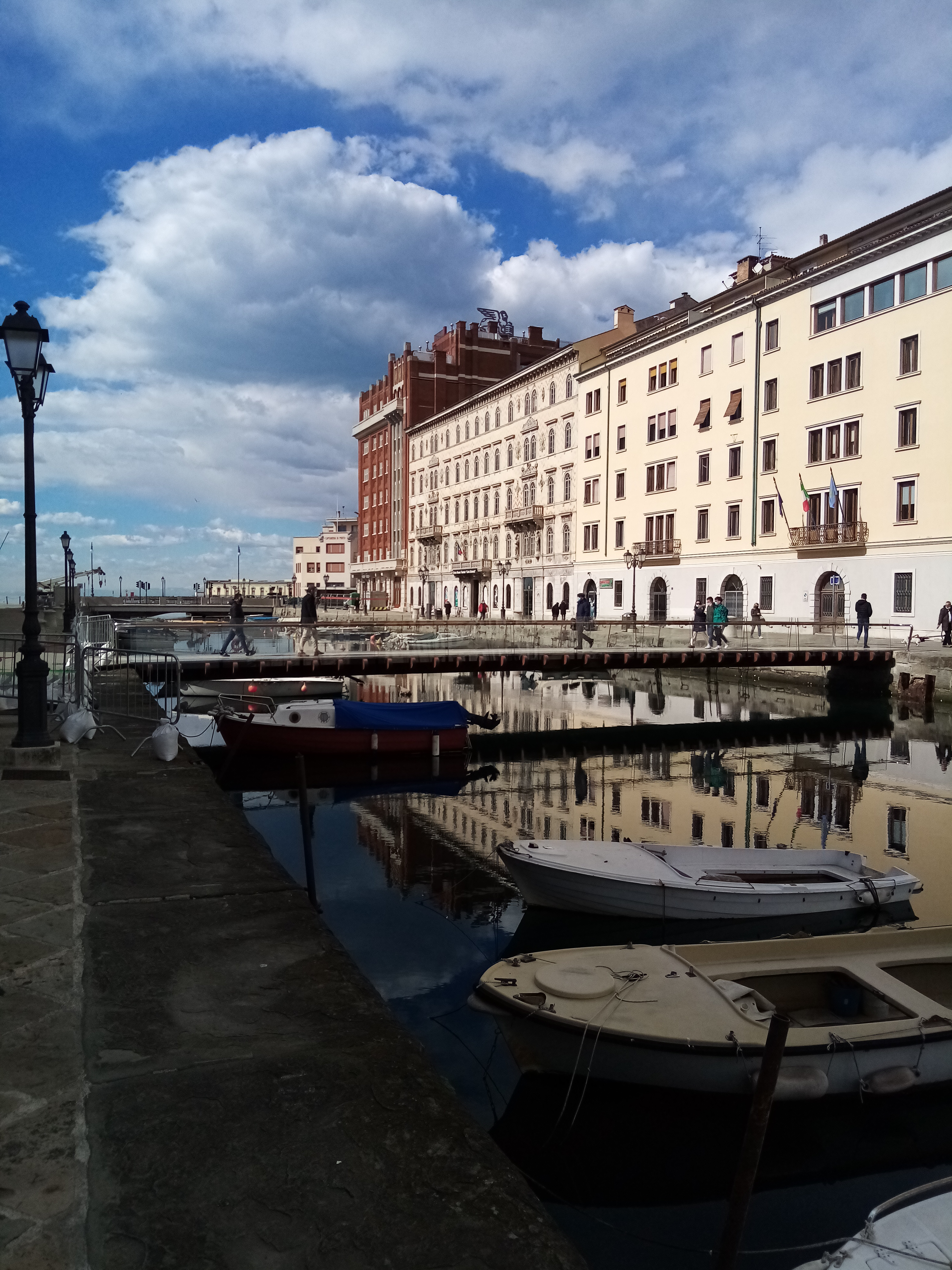
Passaggio Joyce (aka "Ponte curto"), with the "red skyscraper" in the background
