= Alessandro Longhi =

Italian painter

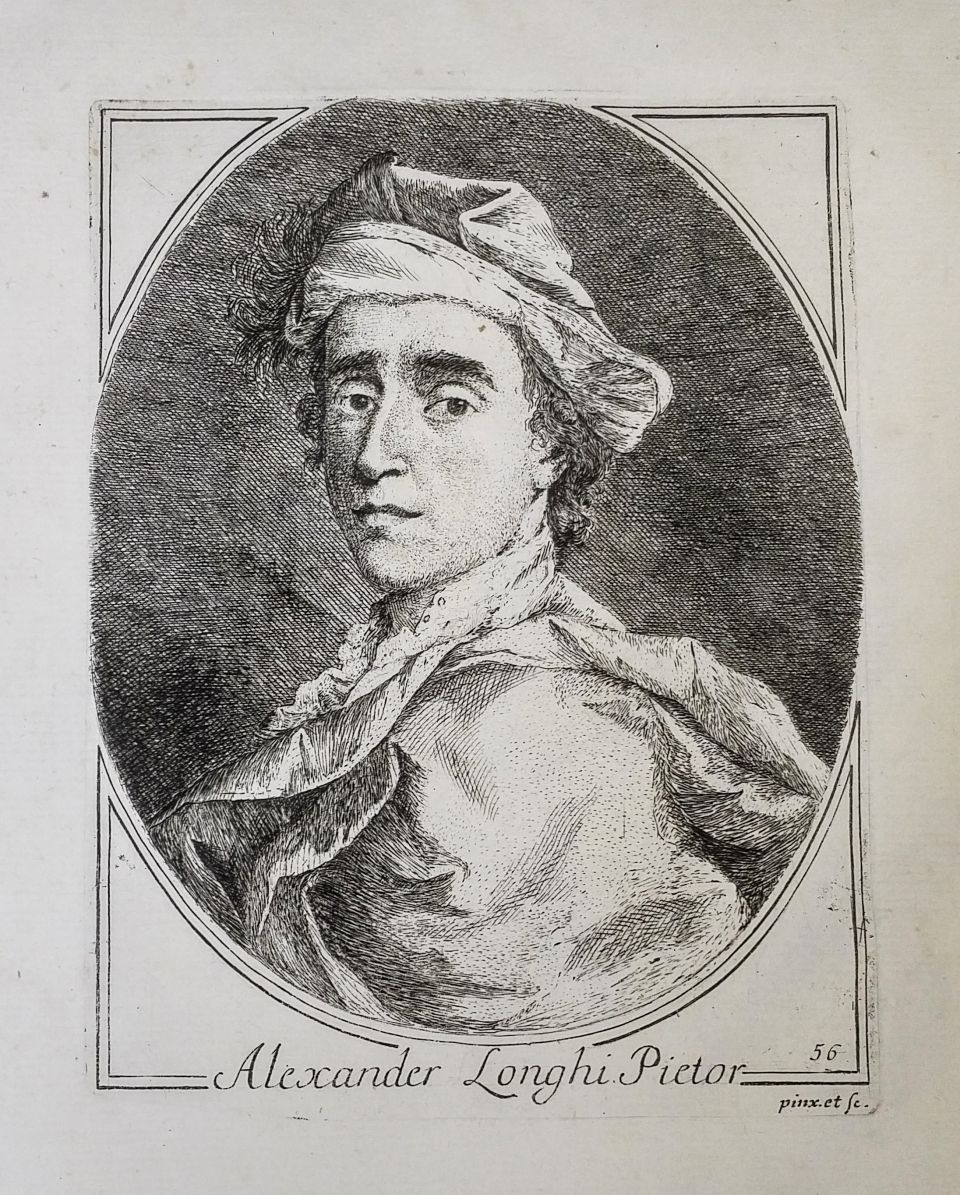
- Self-portrait, 1762
- Born: 12 June 1733; Venice, Republic of Venice
- Died: 8 November 1813 (aged 80); Venice, Kingdom of Italy
- Occupation: Painter

Alessandro Longhi (12 June 1733 – 8 November 1813) was a Venetian portrait painter and printmaker in etching (mostly reproductions of paintings). He is known best for his oil portraits of Venetian nobles of state. Like Sebastiano Bombelli in the prior century, Alessandro Longhi is noted for his zealous full-length depictions of robes and emblems of office. According to Olimpia Theodoli, his "tumultuous and unusual (etching) technique shows first-hand knowledge of Rembrandt's etchings".

== Biography ==
=== Early life and education ===
Alessandro Longhi was born in Venice on 12 June 1733. His father was the famed genre painter Pietro Longhi. He must have received his first artistic training from his father, although the only evidence of this is the similarity of their styles. He was apprenticed to Giuseppe Nogari, one of the best Venetian portrait painters of the first half of the eighteenth century, and his earliest works are bust-length, mostly life-size portraits in Nogari’s style.

=== Early work ===
He first exhibited in 1757 and by 1758 must have been considered a reasonably established artist, for by the end of that year, he had painted two life-size group portraits of the Pisani family. One of these – the Family of the Procurator Luigi Pisani (Venice, Bentivoglio d’Aragona priv. col.) – survives. It includes a number of allegorical figures and, despite a certain facility in the handling of the sitters’ clothes, is reminiscent of a work by Pietro Longhi, only enlarged to life size.

=== Maturity ===
In 1759, Alessandro was elected a member of the Accademia dei Pittori, for which he later painted imaginary portraits of the great artists of Renaissance Venice. His reputation was secured in 1760 when he exhibited a portrait of an innkeeper that was praised for its ‘nuova maniera’. Considering the exalted portraiture typical of Venice over the preceding century, the subject was novel – the innkeeper is depicted with hand raised, ready to carve a roast – and Longhi was praised for his rendering of ‘reality’.

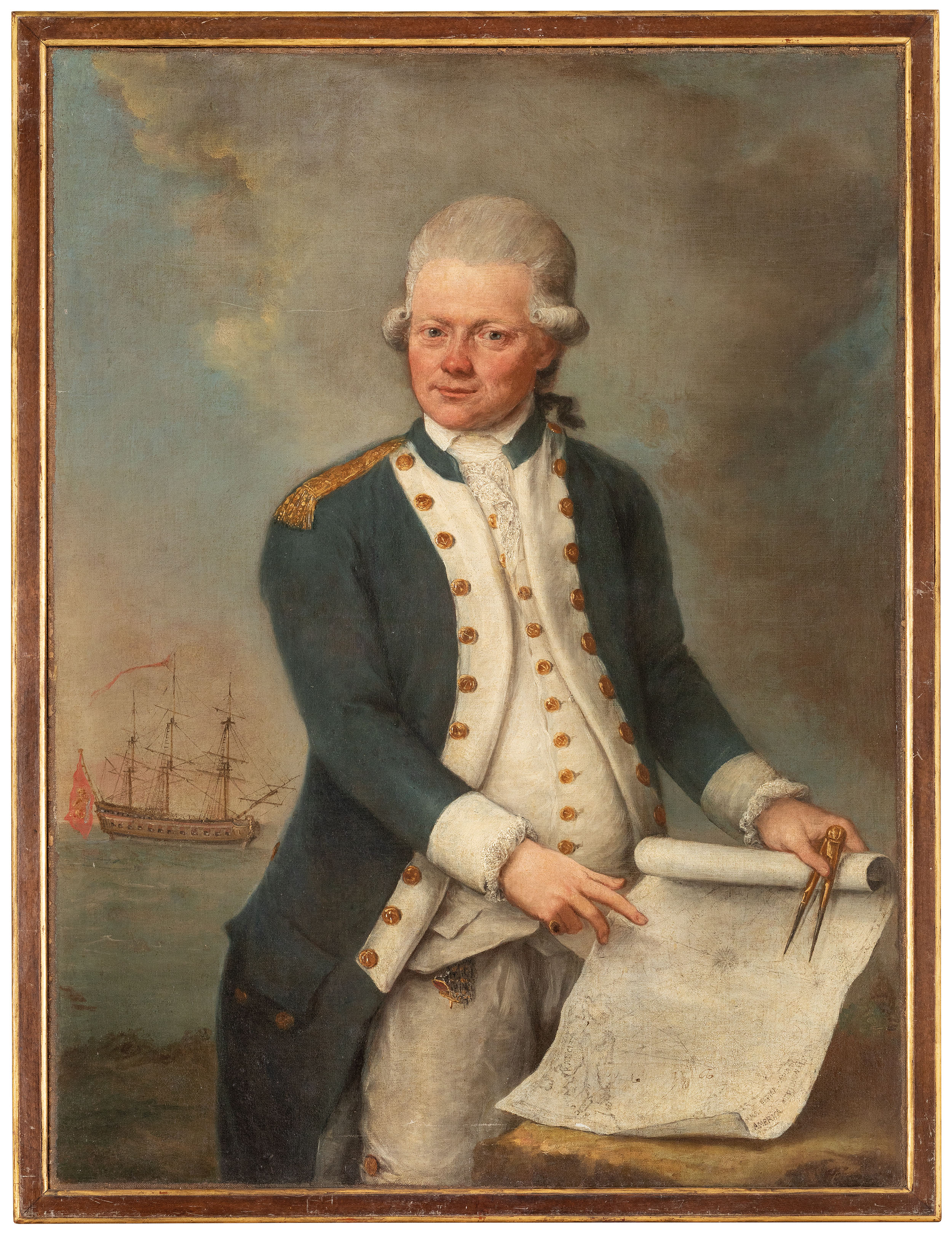
Portrait of Captain Pietro Buldinich, 1781

The scarcity of documented works by Alessandro has made attribution and chronology of his oeuvre difficult to establish. His style appears to have varied little; his formal state portraits woodenly depict gentlemen in full wigs and brocade costumes, with appropriately grand background trappings: imagery that accurately reflected the ossified ritualism of the dying Venetian republic. It is his portraits of less noble patrons that display his gifts. The Portrait of a Nun (1771; Milan, priv. col.) is sombre and straightforward; the portrait of Captain Pietro Buldinich (1781; Venice, I. Brass priv. col.) is a sensitively rendered likeness that suggests that Longhi may have been familiar with English portrait mezzotints. An undated Portrait of a Wine Butler (Venice, P. Mentasti priv. col.) is a good example of Alessandro’s skill. Its subject is shown coming through a doorway onto a balustraded porch; carrying a rough-hewn basket of wine flasks in his right hand, he gestures back inside with his left hand, while his severely rendered face confronts the viewer. There appears to be little flattery in the likeness but considerable sympathy for the man’s well-worn countenance. The difference between this and Longhi’s official portraits is almost shocking and enables the viewer to appreciate Longhi’s reputation for realism.

Alessandro made engravings of his own and his father’s works. In 1762, he published his Compendio delle vite de’ pittori veneziani istorici …, a group of biographies of contemporary Venetian artists, each illustrated with an engraved portrait by himself.

== Works ==
- Luigi and Alvise III Pisani and family
- Portrait of Carlo Goldoni (125 cm × 105 cm (49 in × 41 in))
- Portrait of a Composer, erroneously to be the Portrait of Domenico Cimarosa
- Portrait of a Lady (100 cm × 80 cm (39 in × 31 in))
- Portrait of a Gentleman (65 cm × 34 cm (26 in × 13 in))
- Portrait of a Gentleman (206 cm × 115 cm (81 in × 45 in))
- Portrait of Bartholomeo Ferracino Ca' Rezzonico Venice
- Couple 1 of 2
- Couple 2 of 2
- Portrait of Giambattista Piazzetta
- Portrait of Giuseppe Chiribiri (Cherubini) (83.5 cm × 65 cm (32.9 in × 25.6 in))
- Portrait of Giulio Contarini (102.5 cm × 91 cm (40.4 in × 35.8 in))
- Portrait of Giacomo Casanova
- Portrait of Antonio Renier (233 cm × 137 cm (92 in × 54 in))
- Portrait of a Magistrate
- Painting and Merit
- The Visitation of the Virgin in Sant'Antonio Taumaturgo, Trieste

== Gallery ==
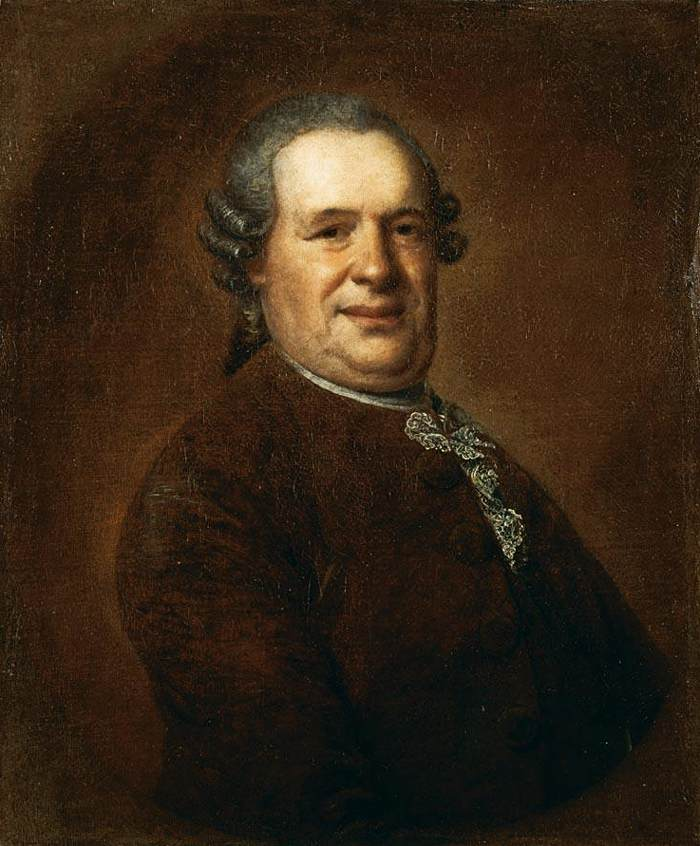
Gentleman

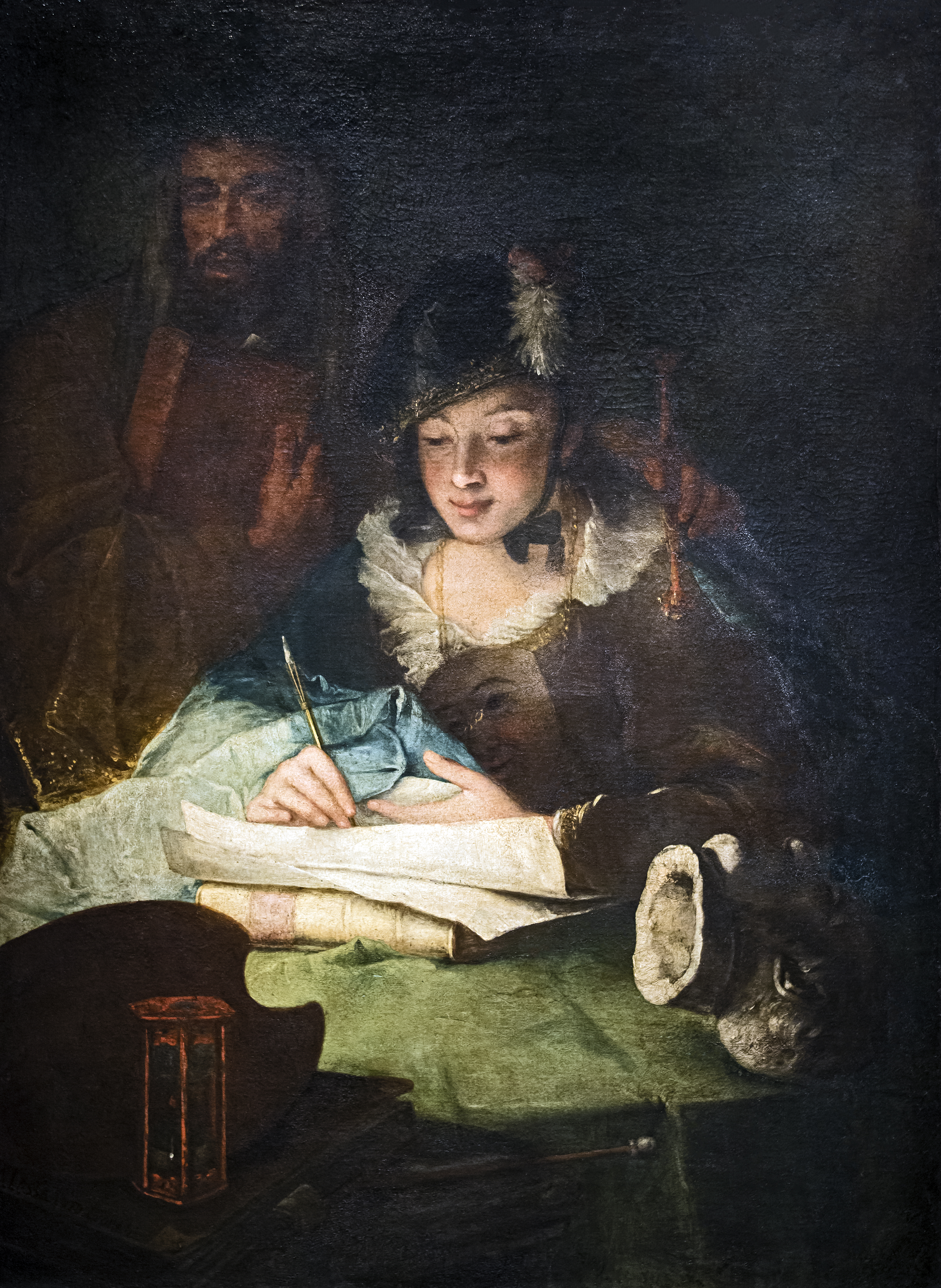
Painting and Merit

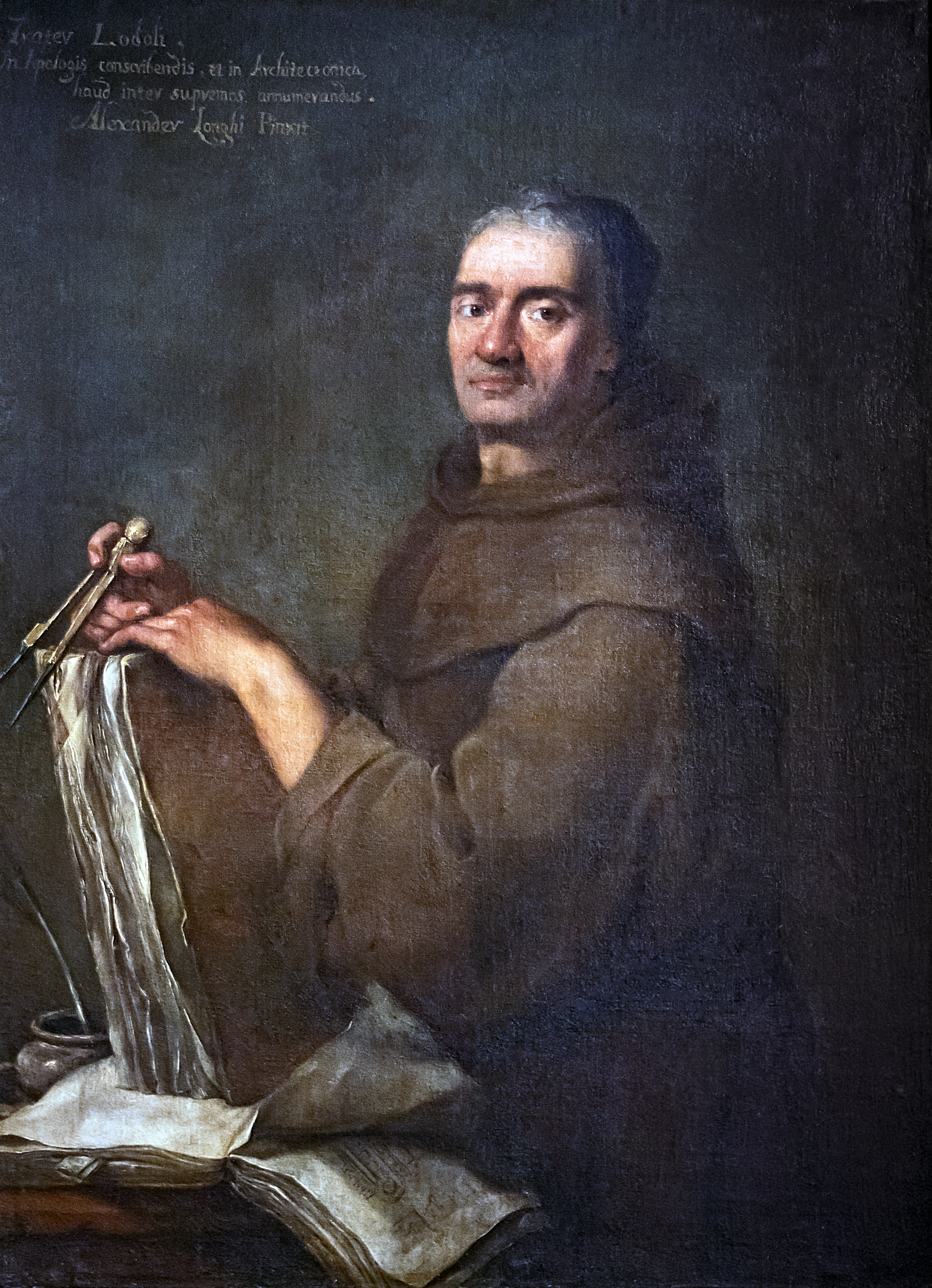
Carlo Lodoli

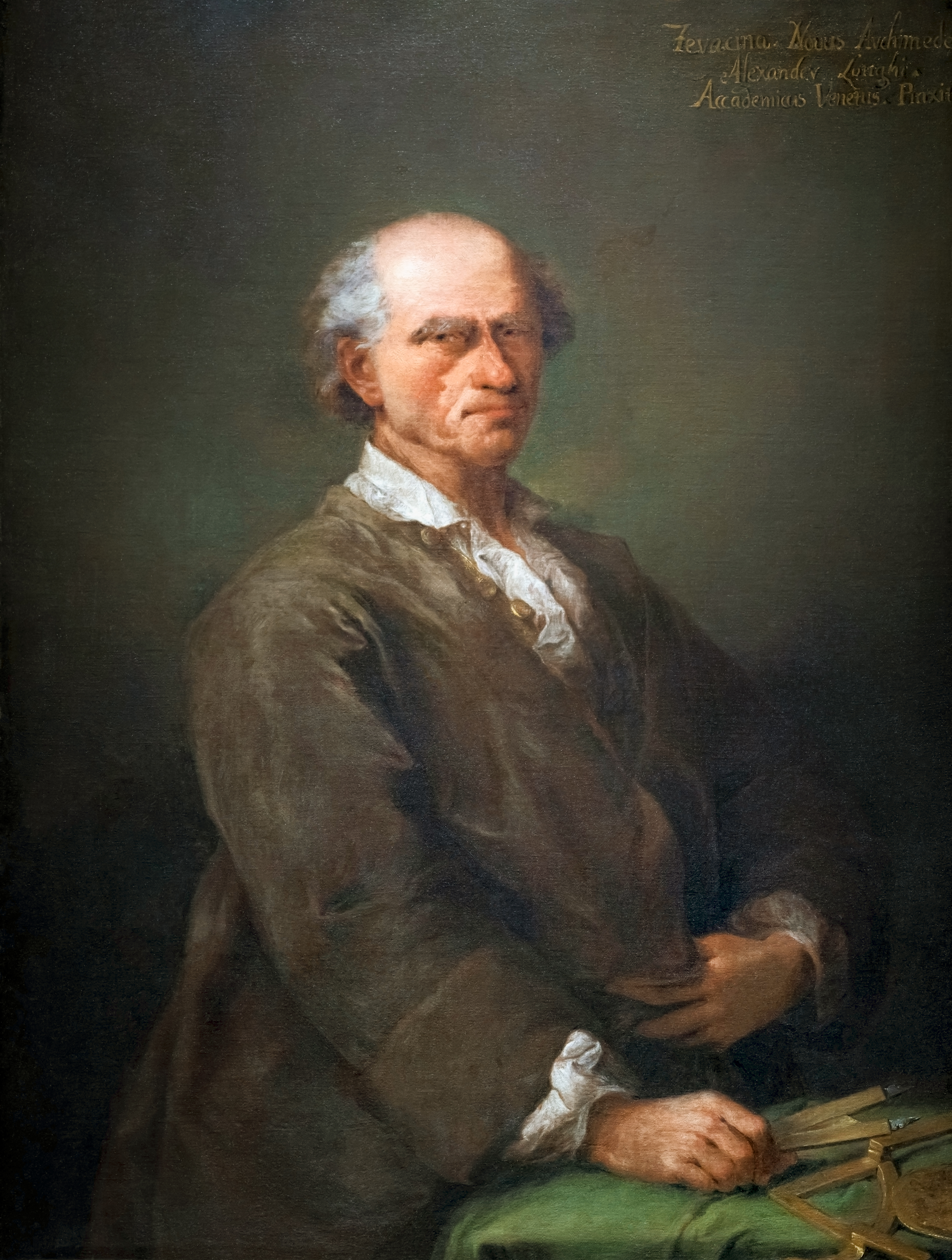
Bartolomeo Ferracina

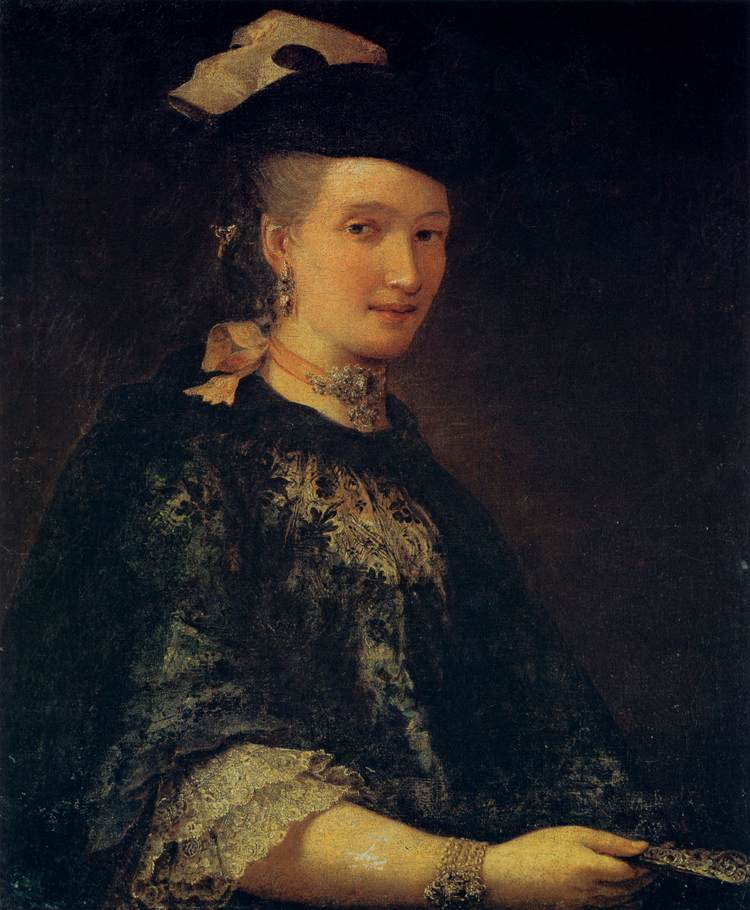
Portrait of Lady

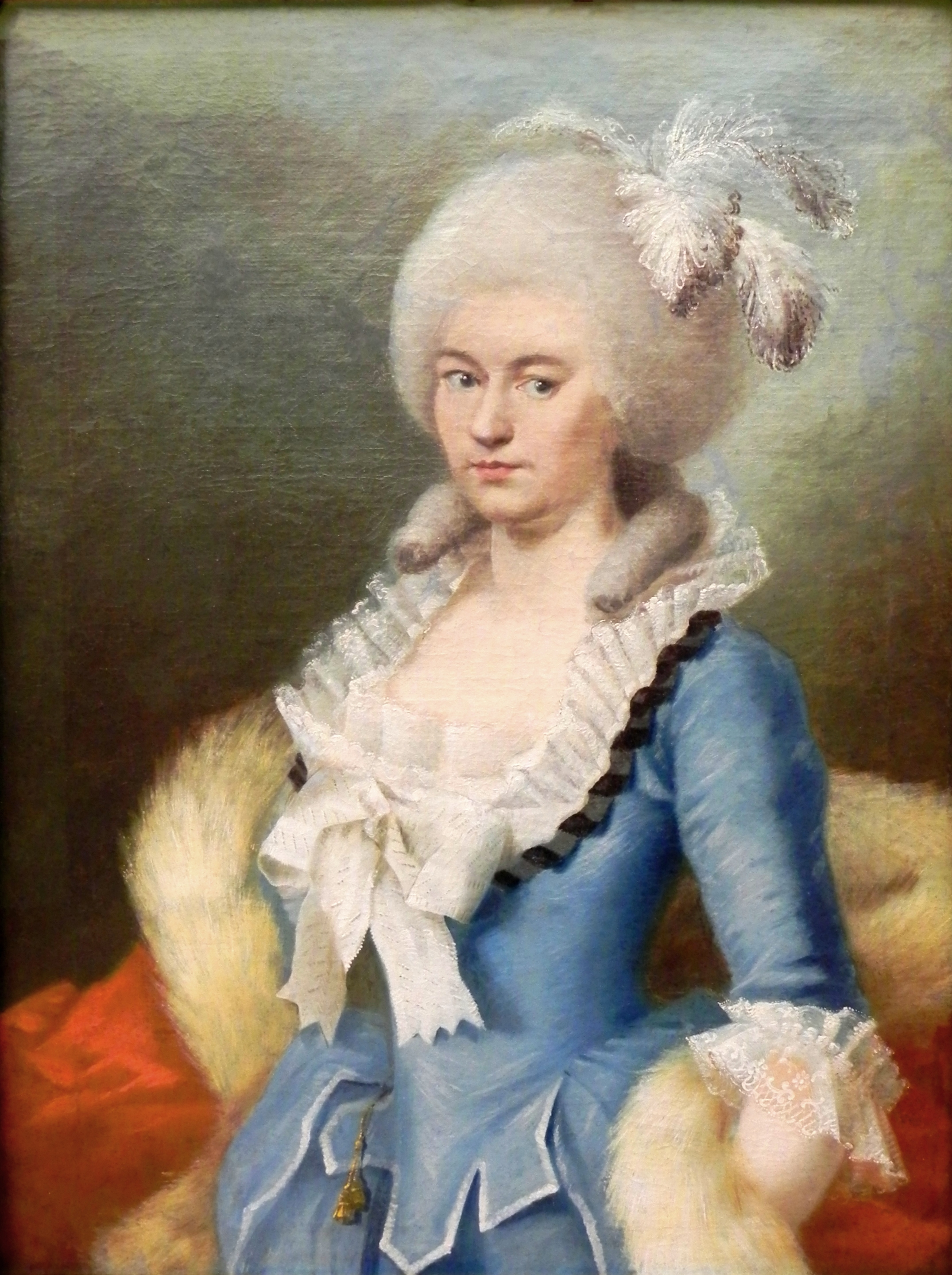
Couple 1 of 2

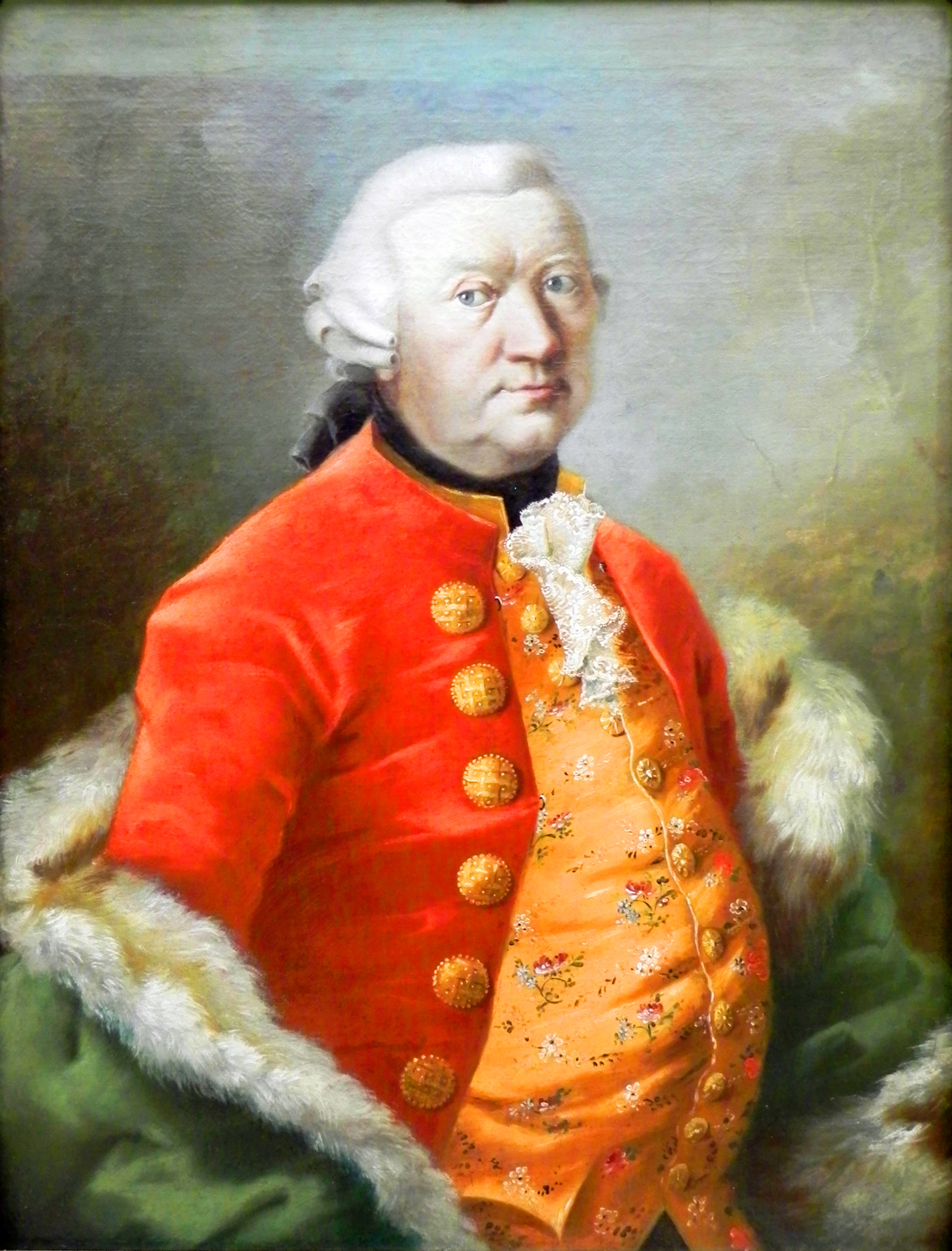
Couple 2 of 2

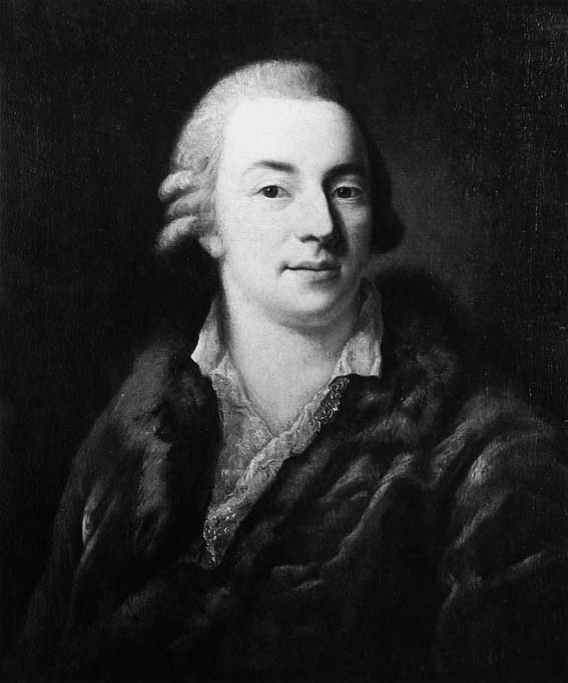
Giacomo Casanova

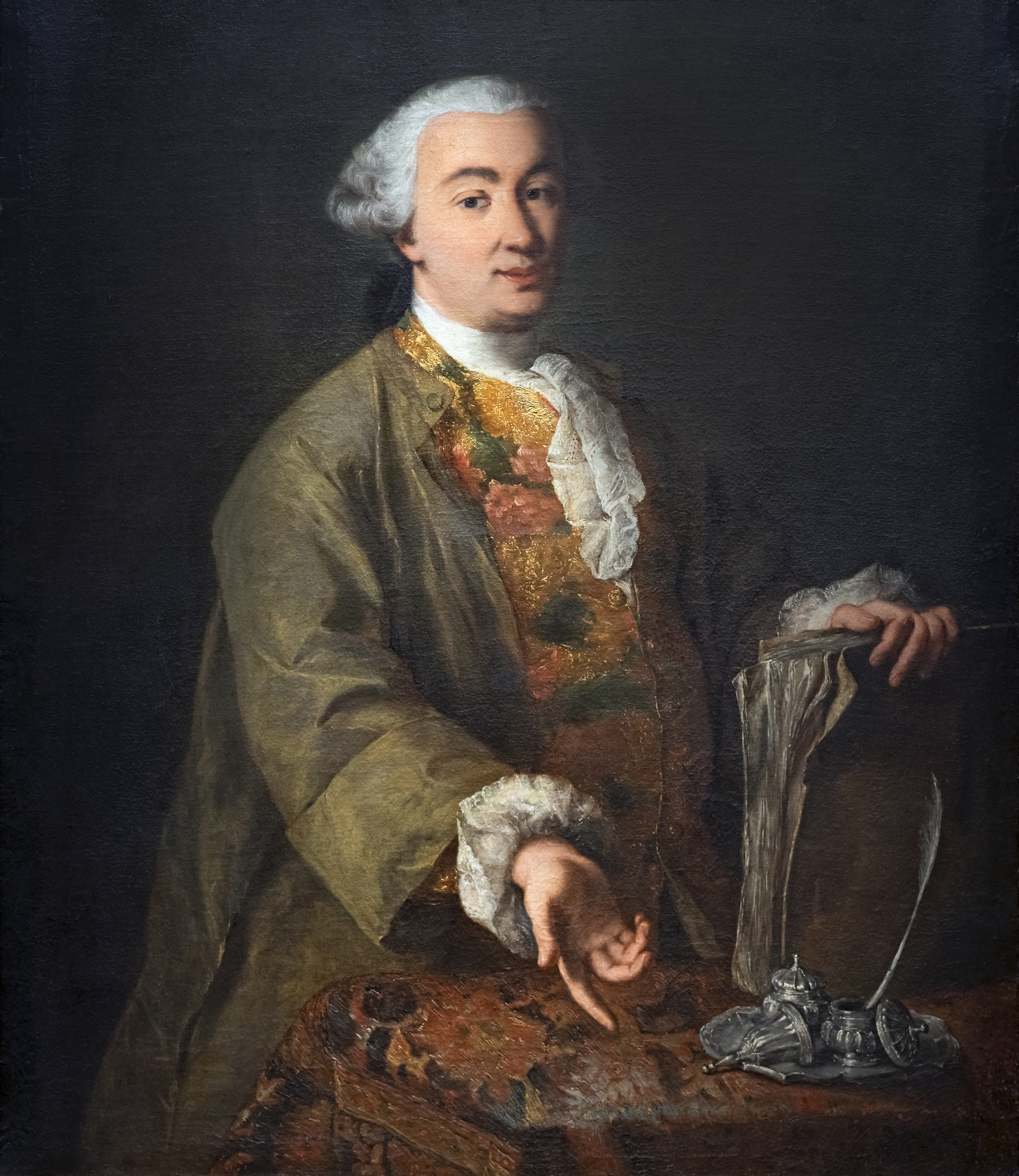
Carlo Goldoni

== Bibliography ==
- Sorce, Francesco (2005). "LONGHI, Alessandro". Dizionario Biografico degli Italiani (in Italian). Vol. 65: Levis–Lorenzetti. Rome: Istituto dell'Enciclopedia Italiana. ISBN 978-88-12-00032-6.
- Wittkower, Rudolf (1993). "Art and Architecture Italy, 1600-1750". Pelican History of Art. 1980. Penguin Books Ltd. p. 493.
