= Sant'Antonio Taumaturgo, Trieste =

Church in Trieste, Italy

Coordinates: 45.6514°N 13.7751°E

Sant'Antonio Taumaturgo
- Chiesa di Sant'Antonio Taumaturgo
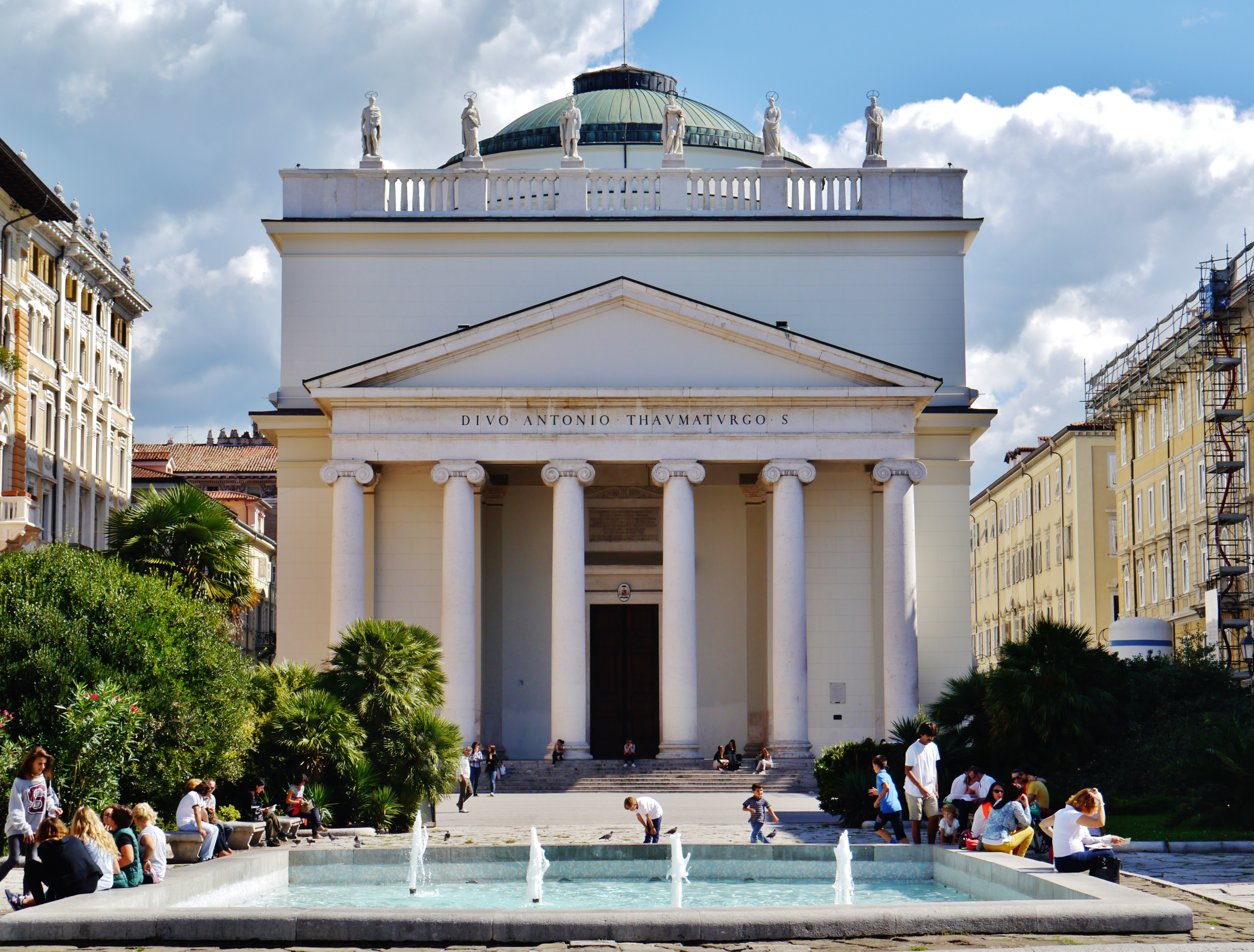
- Façade of Sant'Antonio Taumaturgo
- Sant'Antonio Taumaturgo
- Location: Trieste, Friuli Venezia Giulia
- Address: Via Sant'Antonio, Trieste
- Country: Italy
- Denomination: Roman Catholic
- Tradition: Latin Church

History
- Status: Parish church
- Dedication: Saint Anthony of Padua
- Consecrated: 1849

Architecture
- Functional status: Active
- Architect: Pietro Nobile
- Architectural type: Church
- Style: Neoclassical
- Groundbreaking: 1825
- Completed: 1842; 184 years ago

Administration
- Diocese: Diocese of Trieste

The Church of Sant'Antonio Taumaturgo (commonly known as the Church of Sant'Antonio Nuovo), is the main religious building in the Borgo Teresiano in the centre of Trieste as well as the city's largest Catholic church. It stands on a square also known as Sant’Antonio Nuovo, at the end of the Grand Canal.

The building project dates back to 1808, but work only began in 1825. The church has a facade of ionic columns with six statues sculpted by Francesco Bosa in 1842, representing Saint Justus, Saints Sergius and Bacchus, Saint Servulus, Saint Maurus, Saint Euphemia and Saint Tecla.

== History ==
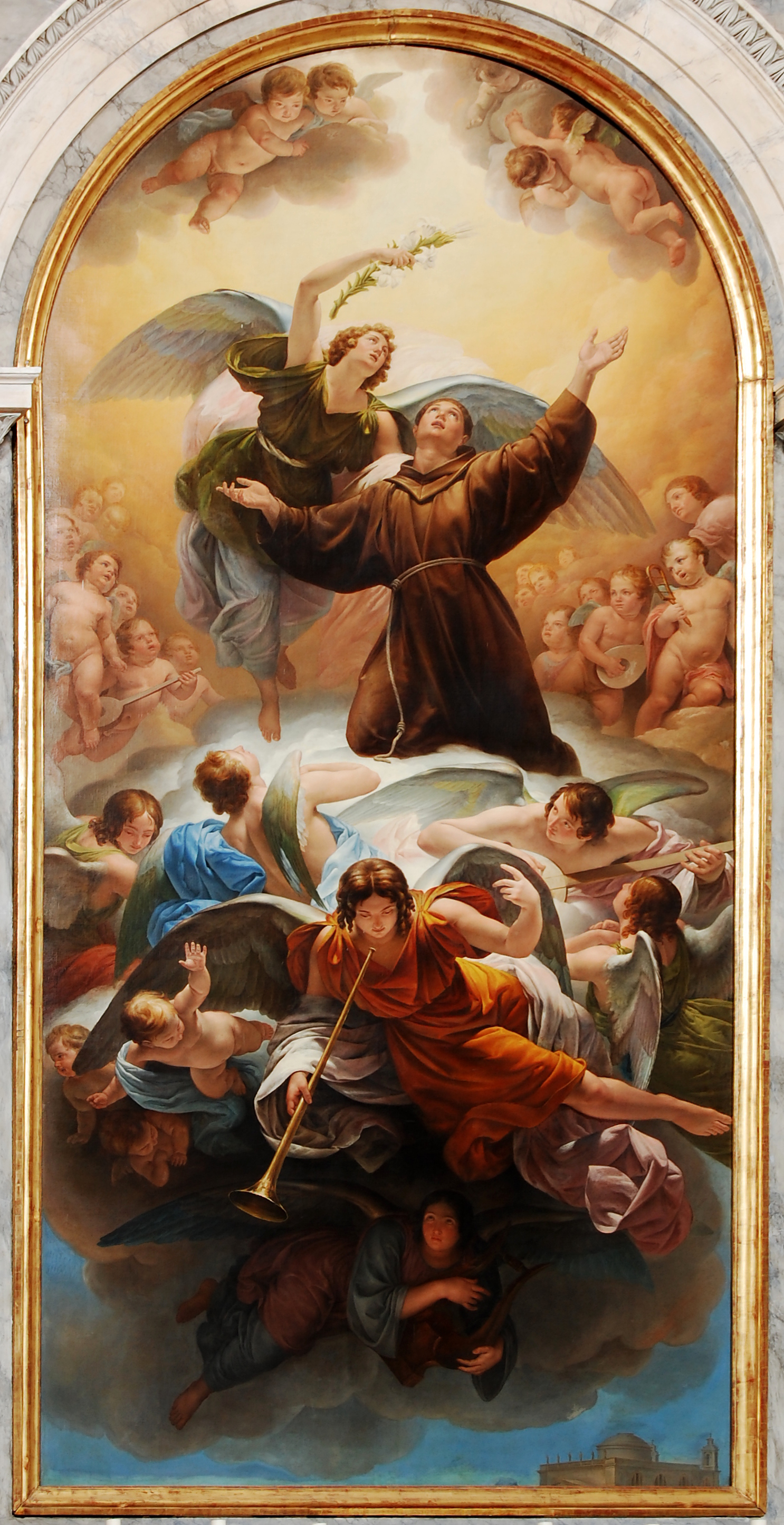
Saint Anthony in Glory, (Odorico Politi)

Until the middle of the eighteenth century, a private chapel dedicated to the Annunciation stood on the site of the present church. After Antonio Rossetti granted permission for the chapel to be opened to the public, the great number of worshippers soon made the space inadequate. As a result, it was decided to build a new church in the baroque style dedicated to Saint Anthony. The structure was completed in 1771 but fairly soon it became clear that this building in turn was too small.

For this reason in 1808 a number of architects proposed an alternative building. The same year the neoclassical design of the Swiss architect Pietro Nobile won a competition. Construction began in 1827 and continued until 1842. It was not until 1849 however that the imposing new edifice (92 x 28 metres) was consecrated. it was known as ‘Sant’Antonio Nuovo’ (new St. Anthony's) because it replaced the eighteenth-century church of the same name. The church originally stood at the end of the Grand Canal, but in 1934 the end section of the waterway was filled in, separating it from the church and allowing room for a new road.

Among the paintings by local artists in the church are Michelangelo Grigoletti’s Education of the Virgin (1838), Odorico Politi’s Saint Anthony in Glory (1842), Felice Schiavoni’s Presentation at the Temple and Sebastiano Santi's Christ’s Entry into Jerusalem Alessandro Longhi’s The Visitation of the Virgin (1769), Ludovico Lipparini’s Martyrdom of the Saints of Aquileia (1840) and Joseph Ernst Tunner's The Crucifix (1838).

In 1958 the two organs in the church were built by the it:Mascioni company, incorporating tracker action:

- the main organ, opus 748 has 72 stops, three manuals and pedals, replacing an instrument by Giovanni Battista De Lorenzi dating from 1834-1835, previously restored in 1922 by Beniamino Zanin;
- the smaller organ, to the left of the presbytery, opus 770, has 16 stops, a single manual and pedals.

The Irish writer James Joyce often attended Easter mass in the church.

== Bibliography ==
- La musica nella Chiesa di S. Antonio Nuovo a Trieste. Udine: Pizzicato. 2000. ISBN 8877364483.

== See also ==
- Italian Neoclassical architecture
