= Pietro Nobile =

Austro-Hungarian architect

Coordinates: 48°08′59″N 16°26′29″E

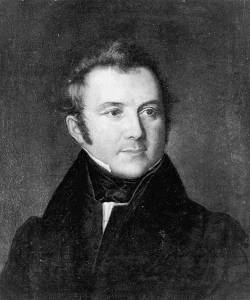
Peter Nobile

Pietro Nobile (born in Campestro (Capriasca), Switzerland, 11 November 1774 – Vienna, Austria, 7 November 1854) was a Neoclassicist architect and builder. He is regarded as one of the most prominent architects of the late classicism in Vienna, and the leading architect of the Habsburg court. His father moved the family to Trieste where the young Pietro attended school. He continued to be educated in Rome by Antonio Canova between 1801 and 1806. In 1807, he was appointed engineer office for construction in charge of Trieste, Istria, Aquileia and Gorizia. In 1810, he was officially appointed chief engineer for construction of bridges and roads in the Illyrian coast in Istria. He designed the coastal road from Koper to Pula, made new plans, sketches and drawings of monuments such as the Pula Arena, the Temple of Augustus and the Arch of the Sergii. He also designed St. Peter's Church standing on Tartini Square in Piran, Slovenia and Sant'Antonio Taumaturgo, Trieste. For the protection of monuments in Pula he did more than anyone else before him.

In 1819, he became head of the department of architecture at the Vienna Academy. His grave is located in Vienna's Zentralfriedhof (section 14 A, No. 46 A), transferred from St. Marx Cemetery. In 1894, Vienna Penzing (14th District) and Rudolf Fünfhaus (15th District), and the Nobilegasse were named after him.
